= C3H4O2 =

C_{3}H_{4}O_{2} may refer to:

Compounds sharing the molecular formula:

- Acrylic acid
- Malondialdehyde
- Methylglyoxal
- 3-Oxetanone
- Propiolactone isomers:
  - Alpha-Propiolactone (α-propiolactone)
  - Beta-Propiolactone (β-propiolactone)
