= Oxetanone =

Oxetanone may refer to:

- 2-Oxetanone, also called beta-Propiolactone
- 3-Oxetanone
