= Oxetane =

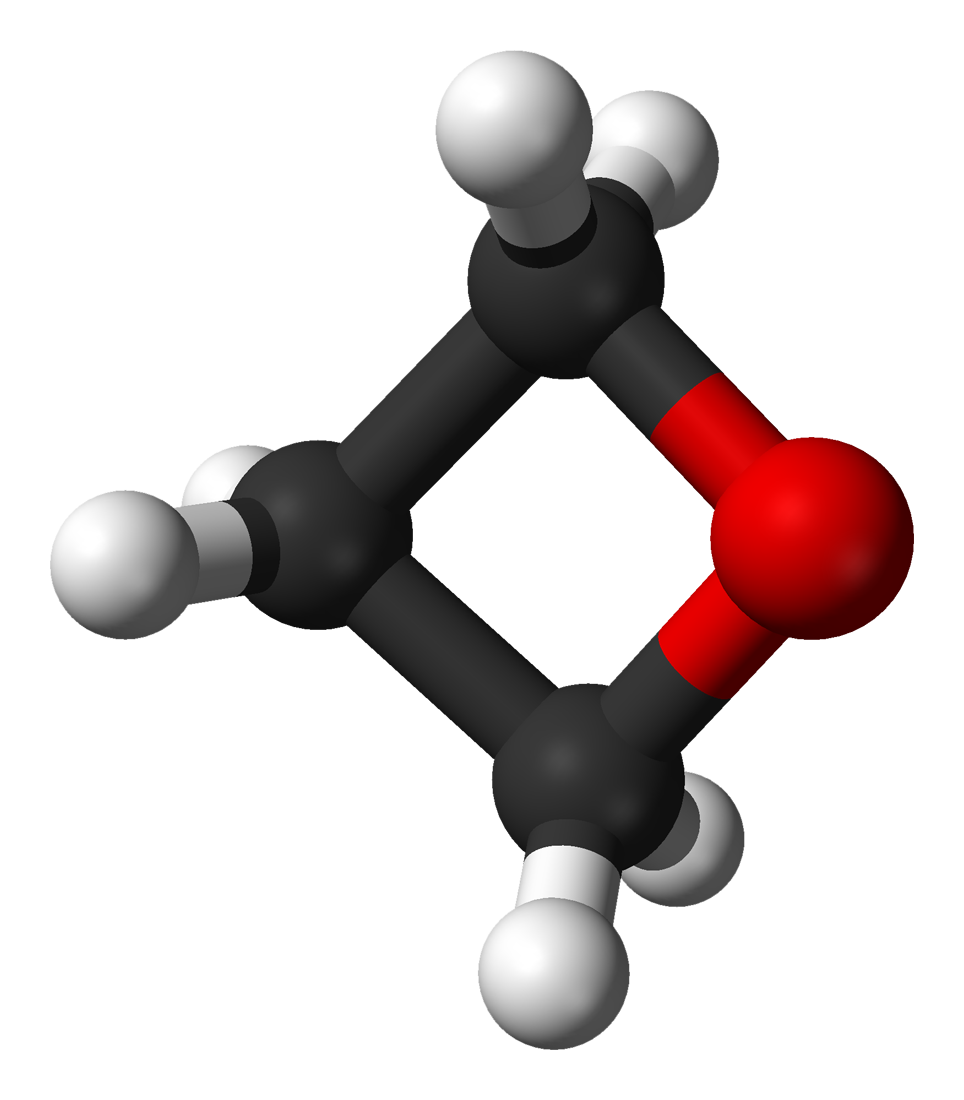
Ball and stick model

Names
- Preferred IUPAC name Oxetane
- Systematic IUPAC name 1,3-Epoxypropane; Oxacyclobutane
- Other names 1,3-Propylene oxide Trimethylene oxide

Identifiers
CAS Number	503-30-0
3D model (JSmol)	Interactive image
Beilstein Reference	102382
ChEBI	CHEBI:30965
ChemSpider	9994
ECHA InfoCard	100.007.241
EC Number	207-964-3
Gmelin Reference	239520
PubChem CID	10423
UNII	I279Q16FU6
UN number	1280
CompTox Dashboard (EPA)	DTXSID8025969
- InChI: InChI=1S/C3H6O/c1-2-4-3-1/h1-3H2 Key: AHHWIHXENZJRFG-UHFFFAOYSA-N; InChI=1/C3H6O/c1-2-4-3-1/h1-3H2 Key: AHHWIHXENZJRFG-UHFFFAOYAE
- SMILES: C1CCO1

Properties
Chemical formula	C_{3}H_{6}O
Molar mass	58.080 g·mol^{−1}
Density	0.8930 g/cm^{3}
Melting point	−97 °C (−143 °F; 176 K)
Boiling point	49 to 50 °C (120 to 122 °F; 322 to 323 K)
Refractive index (n_{D})	1.3895 at 25 °C

Hazards
- GHS labelling
Pictograms	(GHS02: Flammable) (GHS07: Exclamation mark)
Signal word	Danger
Hazard statements	H225, H302, H312, H332
Precautionary statements	P210, P233, P240, P241, P242, P243, P261, P264, P270, P271, P280, P301+P312, P302+P352, P303+P361+P353, P304+P312, P304+P340, P312, P322, P330, P363, P370+P378, P403+P235, P501
Flash point	−28.3 °C; −19.0 °F; 244.8 K (NTP, 1992)
- Except where otherwise noted, data are given for materials in their standard state (at 25 °C [77 °F], 100 kPa). verify (what is ?) Infobox references

Oxetane, or 1,3-propylene oxide, is a heterocyclic organic compound with the molecular formula C_{3}H_{6}O, having a four-membered ring with three carbon atoms and one oxygen atom.

The term "an oxetane" or "oxetanes" refer to any organic compound containing the oxetane ring.

== Production ==
A typical well-known method of preparation is the reaction of potassium hydroxide with 3-chloropropyl acetate at 150 °C:

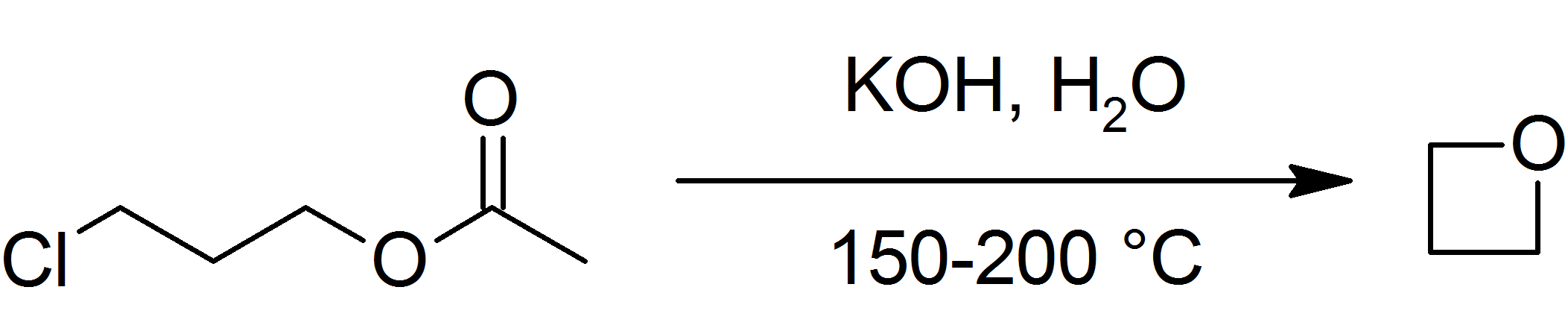

Yield of oxetane made this way is c. 40%, as the synthesis can lead to a variety of by-products including water, allyl alcohol, potassium chloride, and potassium acetate.

Another possible reaction to form an oxetane ring is the Paternò–Büchi reaction. The oxetane ring can also be formed through diol cyclization as well as through decarboxylation of a six-membered cyclic carbonate.

== Derivatives ==
More than a hundred different oxetanes have been synthesized. Functional groups can be added into any desired position in the oxetane ring, including fully fluorinated (perfluorinated) and fully deuterated analogues. Major examples are:

Name	Structure	Boiling point, Bp [°C]
3,3-Bis(chloromethyl)oxetane		198
3,3-Bis(azidomethyl)oxetane		165
2-Methyloxetane		60
3-Methyloxetane		67
3-Azidooxetane		122
3-Nitrooxetane		195
3,3-Dimethyloxetane		80
3,3-Dinitrooxetane		–

=== Taxol ===
Paclitaxel with oxetane ring at right.

Paclitaxel (Taxol) is an example of a natural product containing an oxetane ring. Taxol has become a major point of interest among researchers due to its unusual structure and success in the involvement of cancer treatment. The attached oxetane ring is an important feature that is used for the binding of microtubules in structure activity; however little is known about how the reaction is catalyzed in nature, which creates a challenge for scientists trying to synthesize the product.

== Reactions ==
Oxetanes are less reactive than epoxides, and generally unreactive in basic conditions, although Grignard reagents at elevated temperatures and complex hydrides will cleave them. However, the ring strain does make them much more reactive than larger rings, and oxetanes decompose in the presence of even mildly acidic nucleophiles. In non-nucleophilic acids, they mainly isomerize to allyl alcohols.

Noble metals tend to catalyze isomerization to a carbonyl.

In industry, the parent compound, oxetane polymerizes to polyoxetane in the presence of a dry acid catalyst, although the compound was described in 1967 as "rarely polymerized commercially".

== See also ==
- β-Propiolactone or 2-oxetanone.
- 3-Oxetanone
