= Bogdan A091 =

Ukrainian bus model

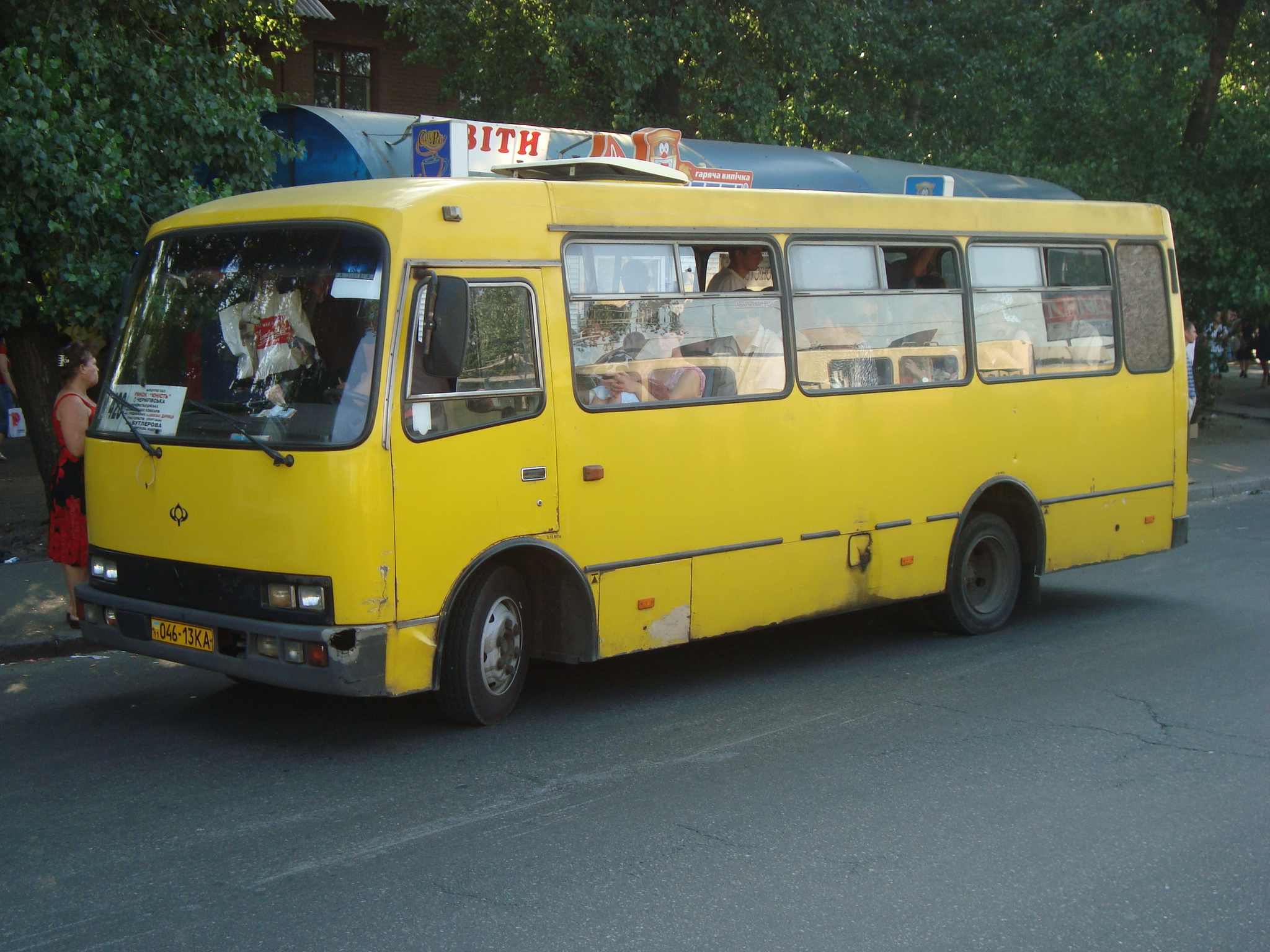
- Bogdan A091 in Kyiv

Overview
- Manufacturer: Bogdan
- Also called: Tur A091
- Production: 1999–2005
- Assembly: Cherkasy, Ukraine (Cherkasy Autobus)
- Designer: UkrAutobusProm

Body and chassis
- Class: midibus
- Doors: 2
- Floor type: high-floor
- Chassis: Isuzu NQR71P
- Related: LAZ A073

Powertrain
- Engine: Isuzu 4HG1-T
- Transmission: Isuzu MXA5R

Dimensions
- Wheelbase: 3,815 mm (150.2 in)
- Length: 7,205 mm (283.7 in)
- Width: 2,370 mm (93.3 in)
- Height: 2,740 mm (107.9 in)

Chronology
- Successor: Bogdan A092

The Bogdan A091, originally known as Tur A091, is a high-floor midibus manufactured at Cherkasy Autobus factory in Ukraine.

== History ==
After the dissolution of the Soviet Union an independent Ukraine needed a new small bus model that would be able to rival Russia's PAZ-3205 at the market. In late 90's Lviv Bus Factory, which was the largest bus assembling factory in the USSR, tried to produce such bus in a partnership with UkrAutobusProm institute however after several prototype models it didn't go anywhere as LAZ decided to end their cooperation. At the same time Oleksiy and Petro Poroshenko's UkrPromInvest had bought the Cherkasy Autobus factory that used to repair Russian buses back in Soviet era. In order to compete with Pavlovo Bus Factory they began their partnership with Japanese truck manufacturer Isuzu and cooperate with UkrAvtobusProm.

May 25th, 1999 at SIA-1999 exhibition in Lviv UkrAutobusProm presented their new Cherkasy-built prototype bus called Tur A091, it was resembling the prototypes of LAZ minibuses since the institute used their previous experience from working on them. The bus was built on Isuzu chassis and had a Ukrainian-made fiberglass body. The model was more comfortable than the ones available at the time, it had a lowered entrance and was equipped with an air suspension.

It was decided to make a new brand name for UkrPromInvest buses, the bus was named Bogdan because it was easy to transliterate it from Cyrillic script to latin, later this name will be chosen for the Bogdan Corporation that will become UkrPromInvest's vehicle production division. The first serial A091 was produced November 4th, 1999, the mass production models acquired a separate door for driver that was absent on the prototype. Also some of the buses produced before 2002 had corrugated sides.

During 2001 Bogdan A091 received a restyling, the grille had been replaced with a plastic panel, the taillights had been moved from rear bumper to the rear mask and the glued glass windows had been changed to a fixated ones. Additionally, the salon now had three seats in a row instead of four. At the SIA-2003 exhibition in Kyiv UkrPromInvest presented their 1000th A091.

New ecological and safety standards have led to the need of replacing the minibus with a modern model which was presented in 2003. The next generation bus received the index of A092 and for some time two models were being produced in parallel however the A091 kept losing its relevance and in 2005 it was decided to discontinue its production.

== Modificatios ==
- Bogdan A091 – base model with automatic doors
- Bogdan A091.1 and A091.2 – intercity variations with hand-opening doors, presented in 2001
- Bogdan A092.3 – school bus with hand-opening doors, presented in 2002
- Bogdan A091C – police bus with hand-opening doors
- Bogdan A091K – mobile X-ray diagnostic complex made alongside Kvant X-ray factory, presented in 2002
- Bogdan A061 – shortened variation for Russian market, presented in 2003

== Gallery ==
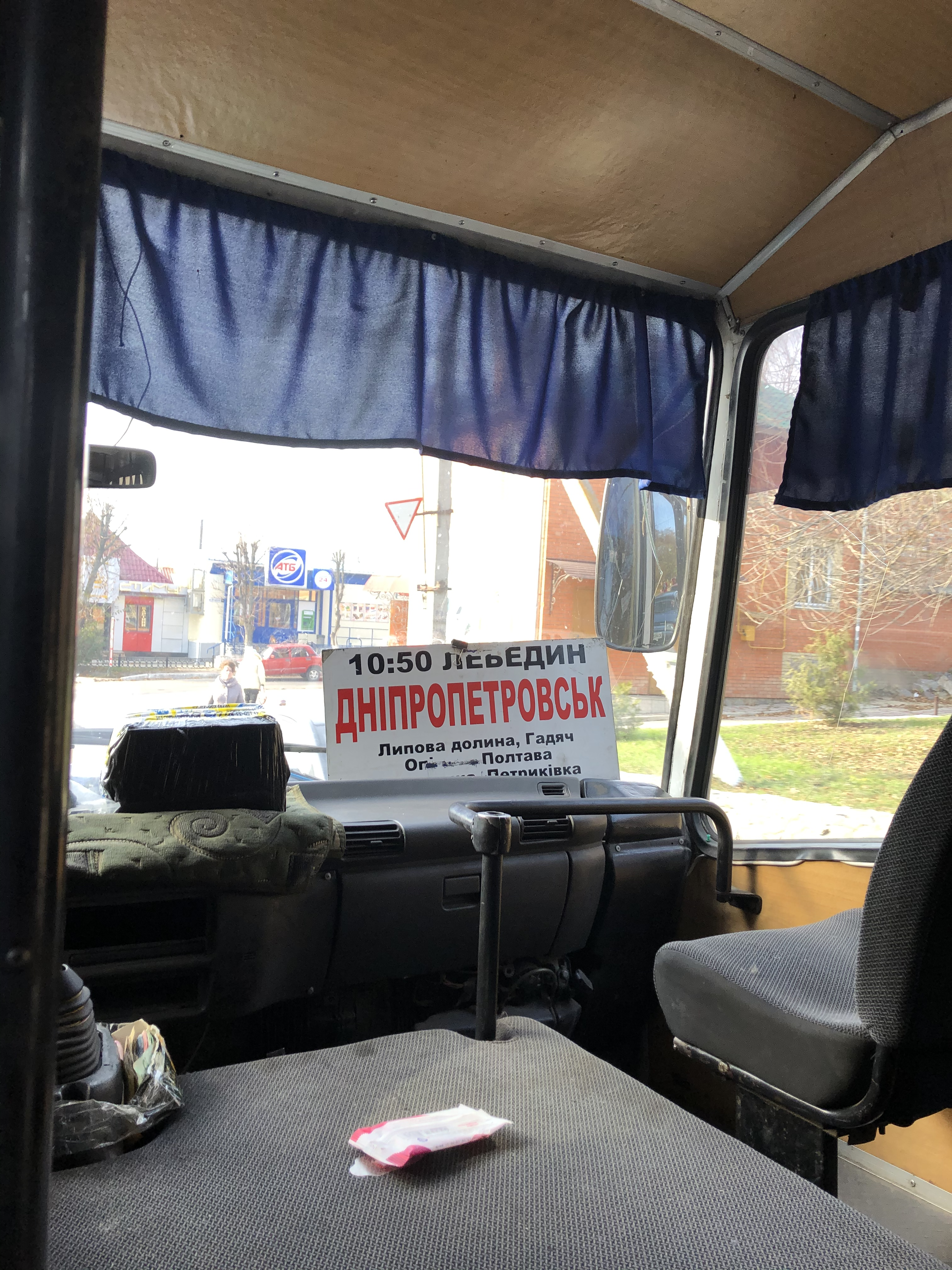
Interior

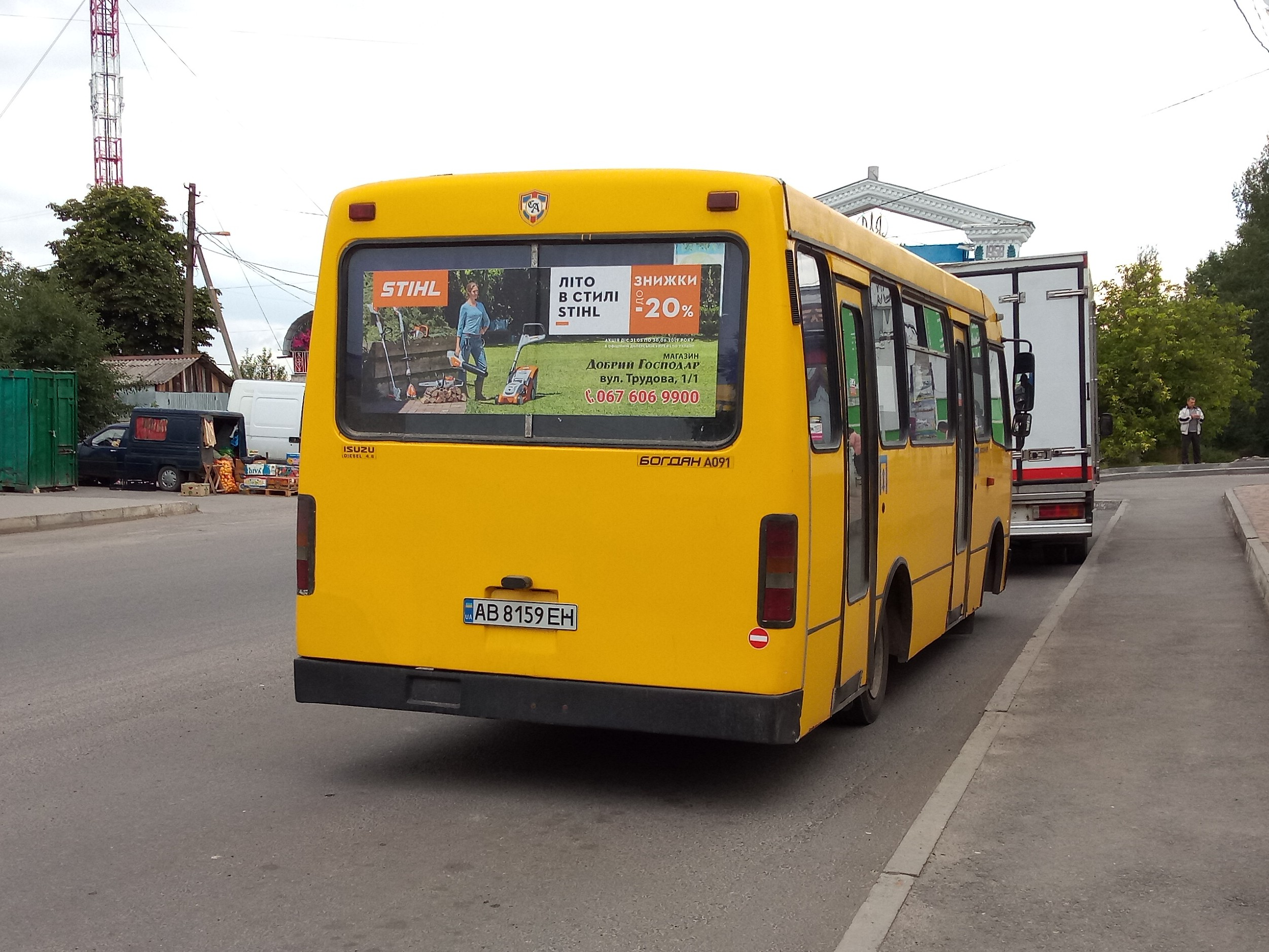
Rear view

== See also ==
- Bogdan (bus model)
