= Polyoxetane =

Synthetic polymer

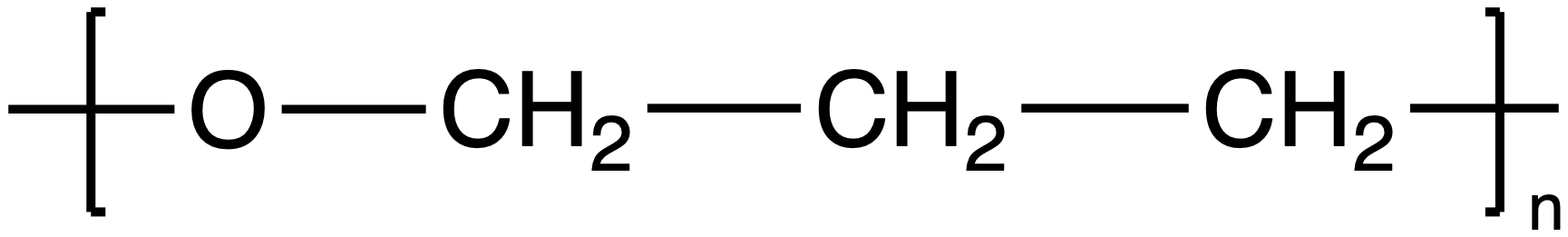
Chemical structure of polyoxetane

Polyoxetane (POX), or poly(oxetane), is synthetic organic heteroatomic thermoplastic polymer with molecular formula (–OCH_{2}CH_{2}CH_{2}–)_{n}. It is polymerized from oxetane monomer, which is a four-membered cyclic ether.

== History ==
Needed chemistry was observed and developed through the 1930s and 1940s. The very first polymerized oxetane was 3,3-bis(chloromethyl)oxetane followed by other 3,3-disubstituted derivatives during the 1950s. Unsubstituted oxetane itself was polymerized in 1956.

== Monomers ==
Tens of oxetane derivatives have been synthesized and many of them are polymerizable. Reasons for inability to polymerize are different basicity and ring strain caused by different electron and bulkiness of substituents also as their position. Major 3-substituted and 3,3-disubstituted monomers are summarized in the oxetane article.

== Polymerization ==
=== Mechanism ===
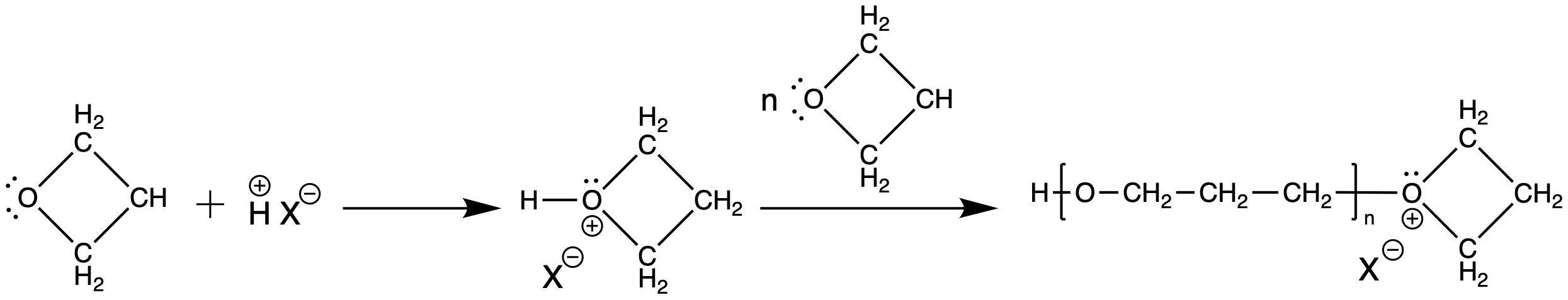
Initiation and propagation of polyoxetane polymerization

Ring strain of unsubstituted oxetane is 107 kJ/mol. That is twenty times more, than non-polymerizable six-membered tetrahydropyran. Oxetane polymerizes via a cationic, ring-openning mechanism. Special oxetanes are polymerizable by other mechanisms.

The propagation centre is a tertiary oxonium ion, mainly initialized by Lewis acids, trialkyl oxonium salts, carbocationic salts and others. Strong acids tend to generate secondary oxonium ions, which are unreactive, thus they are not initiators of first choice. On the other hand super acids (eg. HSO_{3}F) are effective initiators of cationic polymerization of cyclic ethers, such as oxetane. For sufficient stability of propagation centre, a counterion X^{–} of low nucleophilicity is required, such as SbCl_{6}^{–}, PF_{6}^{–}, AsF_{6}^{–} or SbF_{6}^{–}. First polymerizations were conducted with compounds consisting of BF_{4}^{–} or BF_{3}OH^{–} counterions. Propagation is fast and therefore results in lower molecular weight products.

=== Side reactions ===
Unsymmetrically substituted oxetanes polymerizes according to ability of attacking one or both alpha-carbons of the propagation centre. Unsubstituted and 3-substituted derivatives polymerize in symmetrical manner, but 2-substituted derivatives can form any of the basic types of polymer chain connections (head-to-tail, head-to-head and tail-to-tail). However, with right conditions and initiation system used, a stereospecific propagation can be achieved.

Oxygen atoms of the main chain possess enough reactivity to attack oxonium propagation centre to either form cyclic oligomers (usually tetramers) or to depolymerize.

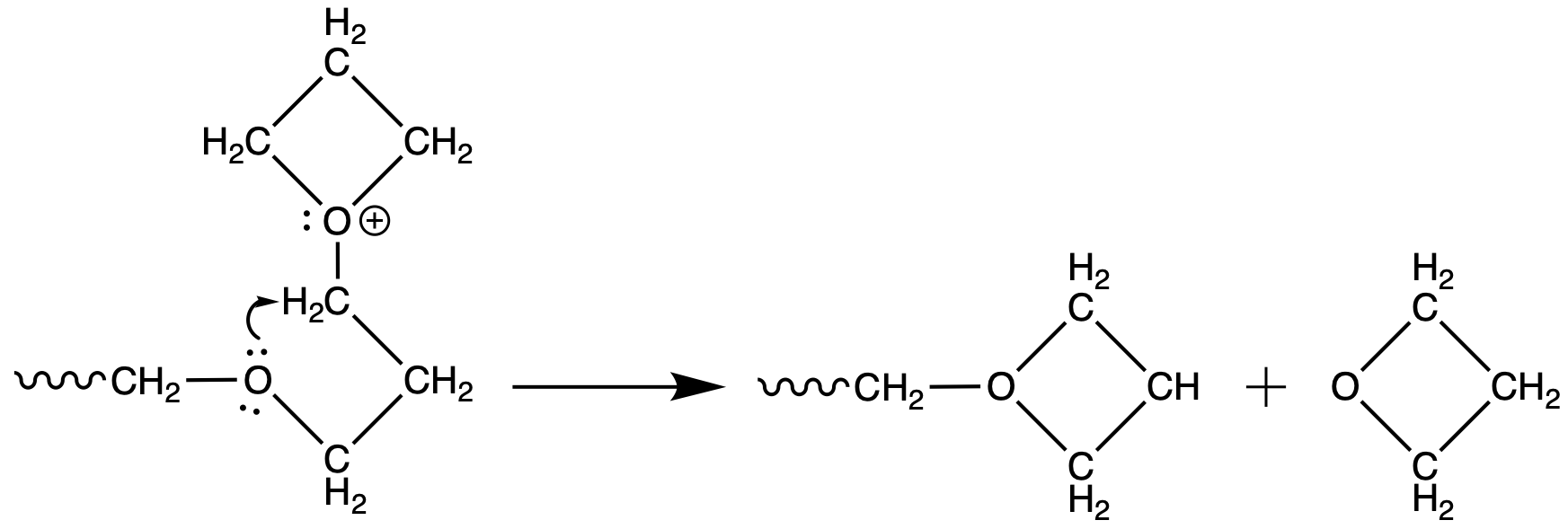
"Back-bitting" of polyoxetane leading to depolymerization

These reactions within one molecule are referred as backbitting. During polymerization of unsubstituted oxetane, mutual attack of two growing chains may occur, in very small number, to form acyclic oxonium ions. This process is so called temporary termination.

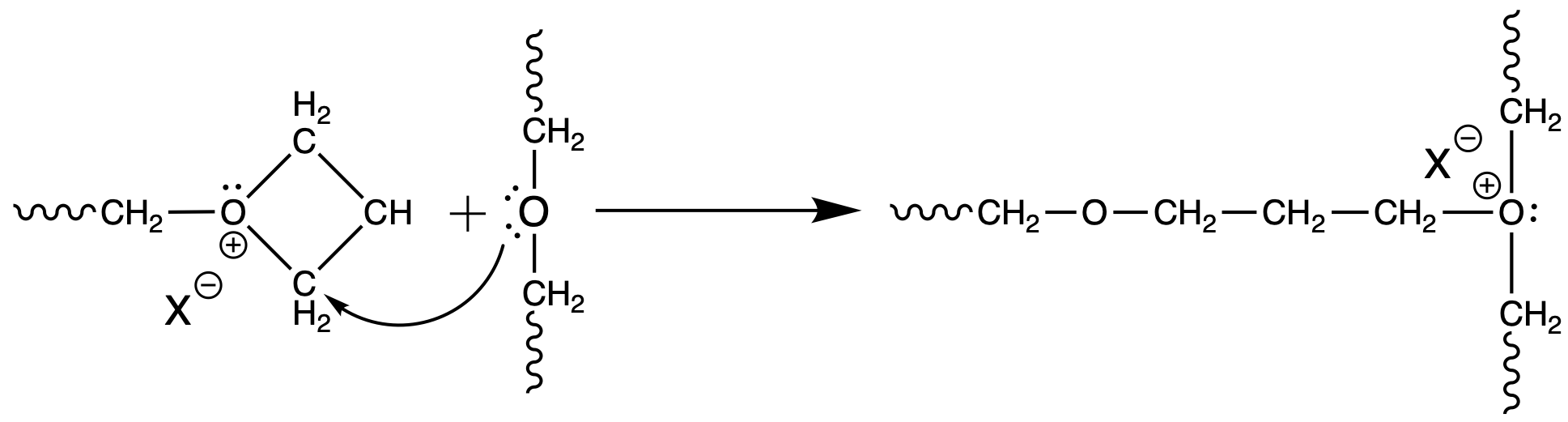
Polyoxetane temporary termination

Mentioned side reactions compete in speed with propagation. The faster the propagation, the less side reactions take place. Speed of propagation depends on polymerized monomer, initiation system used and polymerization conditions set.

=== Example of industrial production ===
Polymerization is conducted in mixture of methylene chloride and petrol in -25 °C for 4 to 8 hours to obtain suspension of polymer. Catalytic system consists of 1-2 % BF_{3} and 0,1-0,4 % epichlorhydrin which acts as a cocatalyst. Final suspension is neutralised, stripped by water steam, filtered, washed and dried.

== Substituted polyoxetanes ==
A series of substituted oxetanes have been synthesized and polymerized. The very first polymerized oxetane was 3,3-bis(chloromethyl)oxetane.

== Properties ==
Polyoxetanes can be liquids or solids with high range of crystallinity and melting temperature. Final material characteristics depend on symmetry, bulkiness and polarity of the substituents. For example, melting temperature of POX is 35 °C. One methyl substituent in position 2 or 3 ensures amorphous character of polymethyloxetanes. Oxetanes symmetrically bisubstituted on the same carbon, give crystalline polymers, such as 3,3-dimethyloxetane. Melting point of poly(3,3-dimethyloxetane) is 47 °C. Halogens increase melting point of oxetane polymers. The bigger halogen atom, the higher melting temperature is. Melting temperature of halogenated oxetanes vary from 135 to 290 °C. Amorphous low melting oxetanes are soluble in common organic solvents, on the other hand crystalline are not.

== Polymeranalogical reaction ==
Butyllithium has been used to break up polyoxetane to lower molecular weight POX glycols with hydroxyl (–OH) functional end groups. With the same result, degradation with ozone followed by reduction by LiAlH_{4} can be used. Polyoxetane glycols can be used for manufacturing of polyurethane networks and preparation of copolymers.

== Copolymers ==
Two main reasons to copolymerize oxetanes are adjustment of crystallinity and modification of material properties.

Oxetanes are copolymerized mainly with tetrahydrofuran (THF) to produce precursors of soft segments of polyurethanes (PUR), polyethers and polyamide elastomers. Particularly statistic copolymer of BCMO and THF is amorphous, tough rubber. Unhomopolymerizable derivatives of oxetane are able to copolymerize with homopolymerizable oxetanes. Most studied monomer in copolymerization problemstics have been BCMO. Also copolymers with thermoplastic elastomer behavior have been prepared.

== Applications ==
Polyoxetanes are engineering polymers. Only one oxetane polymer, derived from 3,3–bis(chloromethyl)oxetane (BCMO) had industrial application. It was available under trade mark Penton by Hercules, Inc. (USA) and Pentaplast (Russia). Main use were sterilizable goods because of relatively high heat-distortion temperature and low water absorption. BCMO is self extinguishing (because of chlorine atoms present in polymer chain) and is highly chemically resistant. It stands up to most organic solvents and strong alkali. It dissolves in strong acids, such as concentrated HNO_{3} or H_{2}SO_{4}. A typical number-average molecular weight range between 250 000 and 350 000 g/mol. It can be conventionally processed via injection moulding. Moulded goods exhibit low shrinkage and fantastic dimensional stability in general.

Examples of parts that can be constructed from costly PBCMO are bearings, valves, parts for fitting cables and electrical parts, etc. It is also a good anti-corrosive coating giving corrosive stability in chemical tanks. It can be used for desalination membranes. Perfluorinated oxetanes (–CF_{2}CF_{2}CF_{2}O–)_{n} where it can exhibit friction-reducing properties and also in gas separation membranes

Significant part of oxetanes are turned into polyoxetanes glycols and other polymeric materials.

=== Energetic polymers ===
By replacing hydrogen(s) in position 3 by electron deficient groups, energetic polymers can be prepared. Desired functional groups are ethyl (CH3–CH_{2}–), nitro (NO_{2}–) or 2-oxa-4,4-dinitropentyl (CH_{3}–C(NO_{2})_{2}–CH_{2}–O–CH_{2}–). Energetic polymers can be used as explosives and propellants or they are precursors for manufacturing of mentioned above. They burn with a great deal of smoke.
