= C2H2O2 =

The molecular formula C_{2}H_{2}O_{2} may refer to:

- Acetylenediol, or ethynediol:
- Glyoxal:
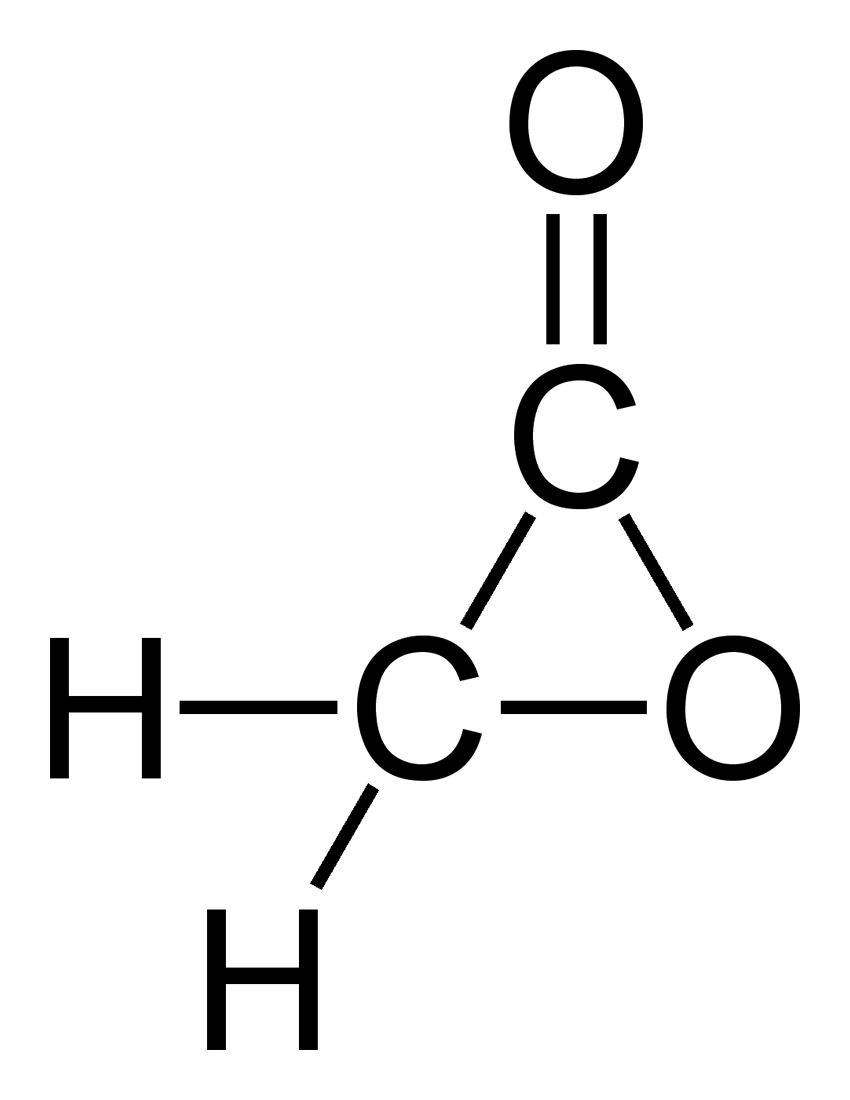
- Acetolactone:
