= Oxalic anhydride =

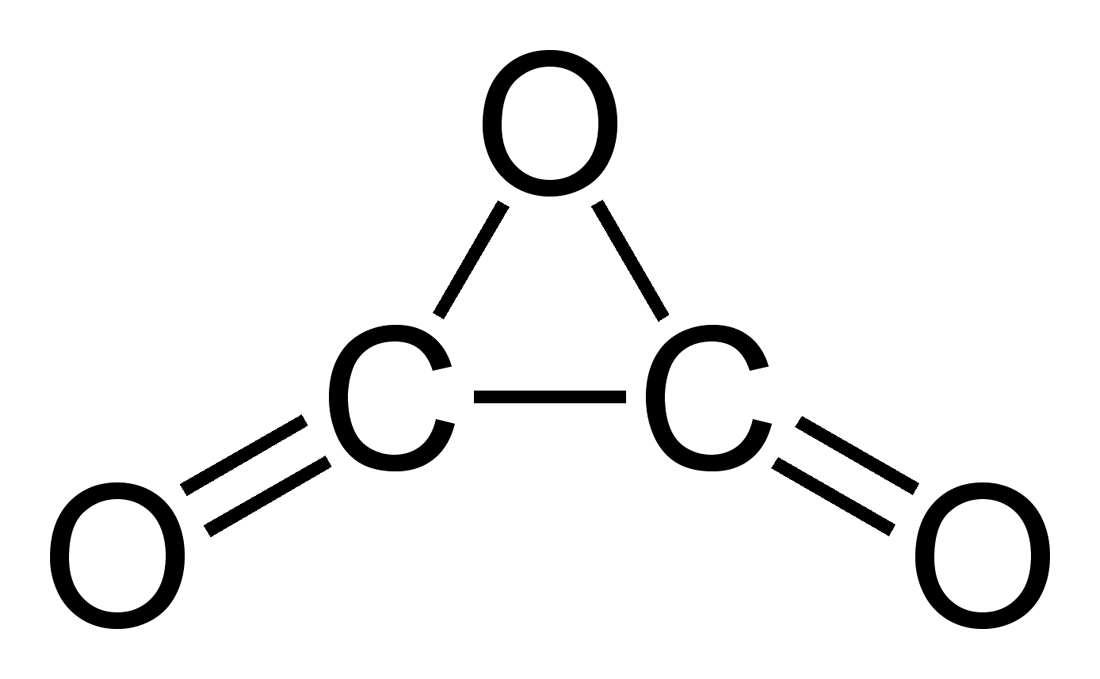

Names
- Preferred IUPAC name Oxiranedione
- Other names oxalic anhydride ethanedioic anhydride

Identifiers
CAS Number	308818-63-5
3D model (JSmol)	Interactive image
ChemSpider	13693079
PubChem CID	23297885
CompTox Dashboard (EPA)	DTXSID00632683
- InChI: InChI=1S/C2O3/c3-1-2(4)5-1 Key: PFPYHYZFFJJQFD-UHFFFAOYSA-N; InChI=1/C2O3/c3-1-2(4)5-1 Key: PFPYHYZFFJJQFD-UHFFFAOYAE
- SMILES: O=C1OC1=O

Properties
Chemical formula	C_{2}O_{3}
Molar mass	72.019 g·mol^{−1}
- Except where otherwise noted, data are given for materials in their standard state (at 25 °C [77 °F], 100 kPa). verify (what is ?) Infobox references

Oxalic anhydride or ethanedioic anhydride, also called oxiranedione, is a hypothetical organic compound, one of several isomers having the formula C_{2}O_{3} that have been studied computationally. It can be viewed as the anhydride of oxalic acid or the two-fold ketone of ethylene oxide. It is an oxide of carbon (an oxocarbon).

The simple compound apparently has yet to be observed (as of 2009). In 1998, however, Paolo Strazzolini and others have claimed the synthesis of dioxane tetraketone (C_{4}O_{6}), which can be viewed as the cyclic dimer of oxalic anhydride.

It has been conjectured to be a fleeting intermediate in the thermal decomposition of certain oxalates and certain chemoluminescent reactions of oxalyl chloride.

== See also ==
- 1,2-dioxetanedione
- α-acetolactone
