= 3,3-Bis(azidomethyl)oxetane =

Names
- Preferred IUPAC name 3,3-Bis(azidomethyl)oxetane

Identifiers
CAS Number	17607-20-4
3D model (JSmol)	Interactive image
Abbreviations	BAMO
ChemSpider	10723826
PubChem CID	12725338
CompTox Dashboard (EPA)	DTXSID40508156
- InChI: Key: GOPVUFFWLXPUBM-UHFFFAOYSA-N; InChI=1S/C5H8N6O/c6-10-8-1-5(2-9-11-7)3-12-4-5/h1-4H2
- SMILES: C1C(CO1)(CN=[N+]=[N-])CN=[N+]=[N-]

Properties
Chemical formula	C_{5}H_{8}N_{6}O
Molar mass	168.160 g·mol^{−1}
- Except where otherwise noted, data are given for materials in their standard state (at 25 °C [77 °F], 100 kPa). Infobox references

3,3-Bis(azidomethyl)oxetane (BAMO) is a oxetane monomer used in energetic propellant binders and plasticizer. It is frequently used as a copolymer to improve the physical properties of more commonly used polymers and to give them energetic properties.

== Preparation ==
BAMO is made by reacting BCMO with sodium azide in an alkaline solution. Tetrabutyl ammonium bromide is used as a phase-transfer catalyst in the reaction.

PolyBAMO can be made by mixing boron trifluoride diethyl etherate and BAMO in trimethylolpropane. The polymerization of BAMO destroys the oxetane ring, but the azide groups remain intact.
