= Acetolactone =

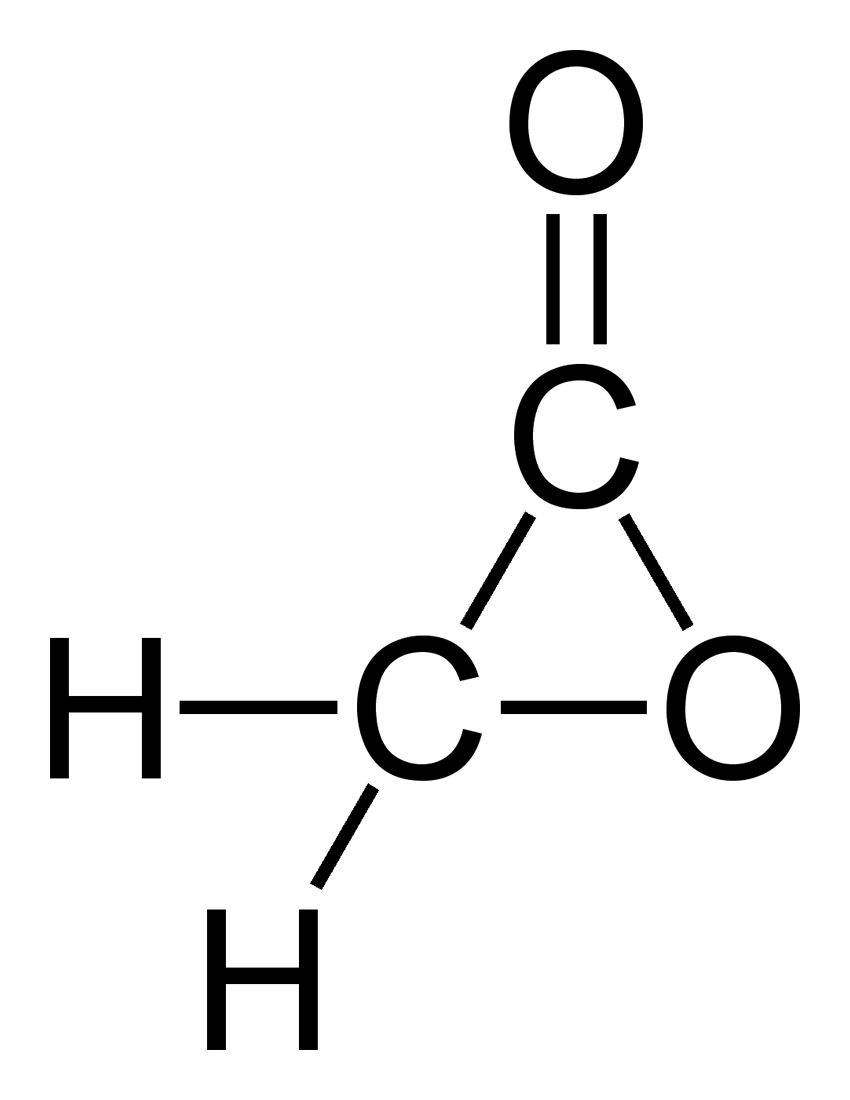
Structural formula
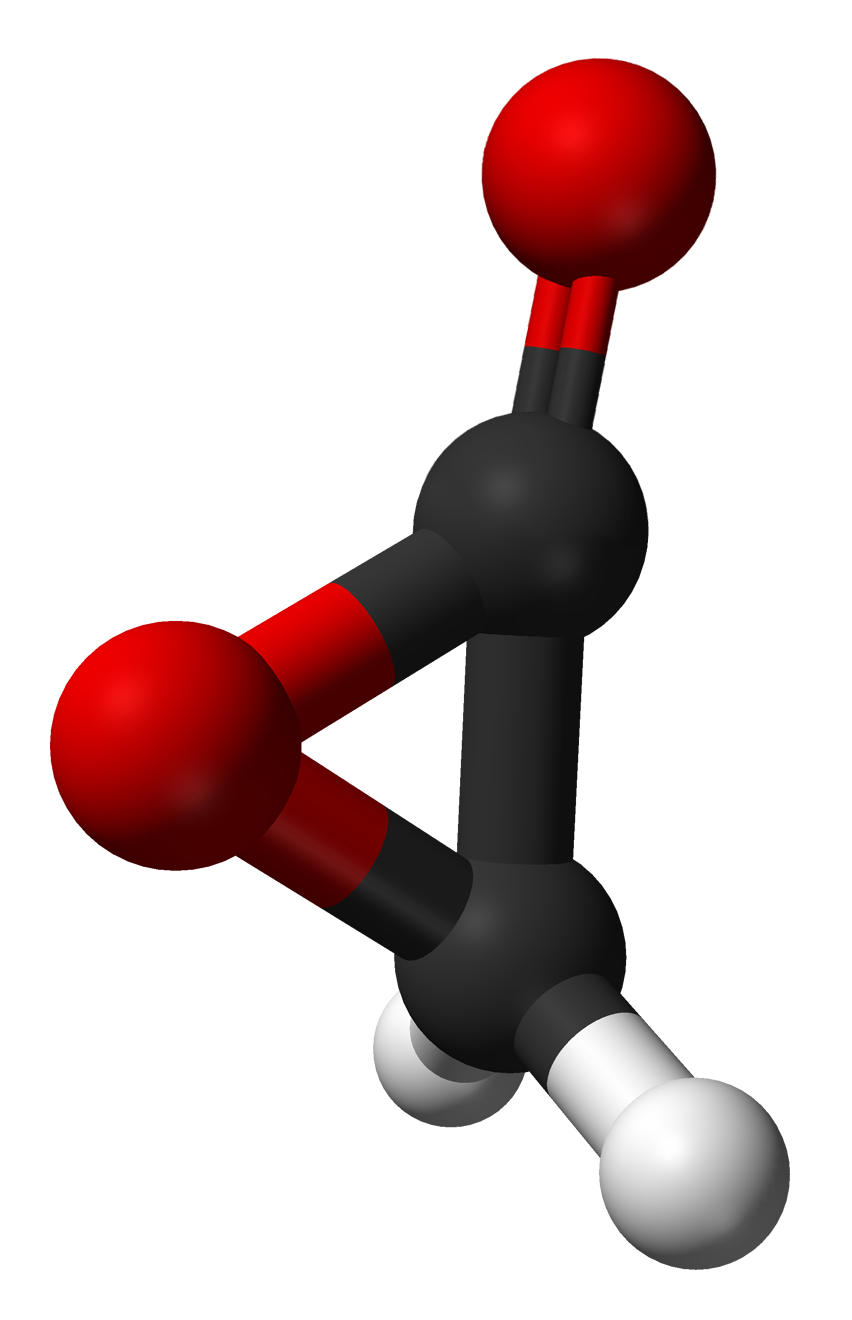
Ball-and-stick model

Names
- IUPAC name Oxiran-2-one
- Preferred IUPAC name Oxiranone

Identifiers
CAS Number	42879-41-4
3D model (JSmol)	Interactive image
ChemSpider	393042
PubChem CID	445391
CompTox Dashboard (EPA)	DTXSID30332189
- InChI: InChI=1S/C2H2O2/c3-2-1-4-2/h1H2 Key: HZSIFDFXFAXICF-UHFFFAOYSA-N; InChI=1/C2H2O2/c3-2-1-4-2/h1H2 Key: HZSIFDFXFAXICF-UHFFFAOYAQ
- SMILES: O=C1OC1

Properties
Chemical formula	C_{2}H_{2}O_{2}
Molar mass	58.036 g·mol^{−1}
- Except where otherwise noted, data are given for materials in their standard state (at 25 °C [77 °F], 100 kPa). verify (what is ?) Infobox references

In organic chemistry, α‑lactone refers to a functional group, the smallest possible lactone. It is a family of unstable, three-membered heterocycles, containing an epoxide ring fused with a carbonyl group.

The parent, acetolactone (α-acetolactone), is an organic compound with formula C_{2}H_{2}O_{2}, and has not been isolated in bulk. The compound was first described in 1997 as a transient species in mass spectrometry experiments.

Generally, α‑lactones are produced by the cryogenic, photochemical decarboxylation of peroxymalonic anhydrides. Even at 77 K, the products rapidly polymerize or decarbonylate to ketones or aldehydes.

An exception is bis(trifluoromethyl)acetolactone ((CF_{3})_{2}C_{2}O_{2}), stabilized by its two trifluoromethyl groups. That compound has a half-life of 8 hours at 25 °C.

Α-Thiolactones can be produced via oxygen transfer from a nitrone to a thioketene.

== See also ==
- α-Propiolactone
- Oxalic anhydride
