= C15H16O5 =

The molecular formula C_{15}H_{16}O_{5} (molar mass: 276.28 g/mol, exact mass: 276.099774 u) may refer to:

- Dihydromethysticin, a kavalactone found in the kava plant
- Lactucin, a bitter sesquiterpene lactone found in lettuce
- Vernolepin, a sesquiterpene lactone found in Vernonia amygdalina
