= Malonic anhydride =

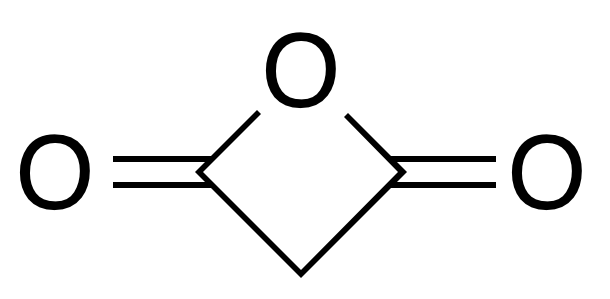
- Skeletal formula

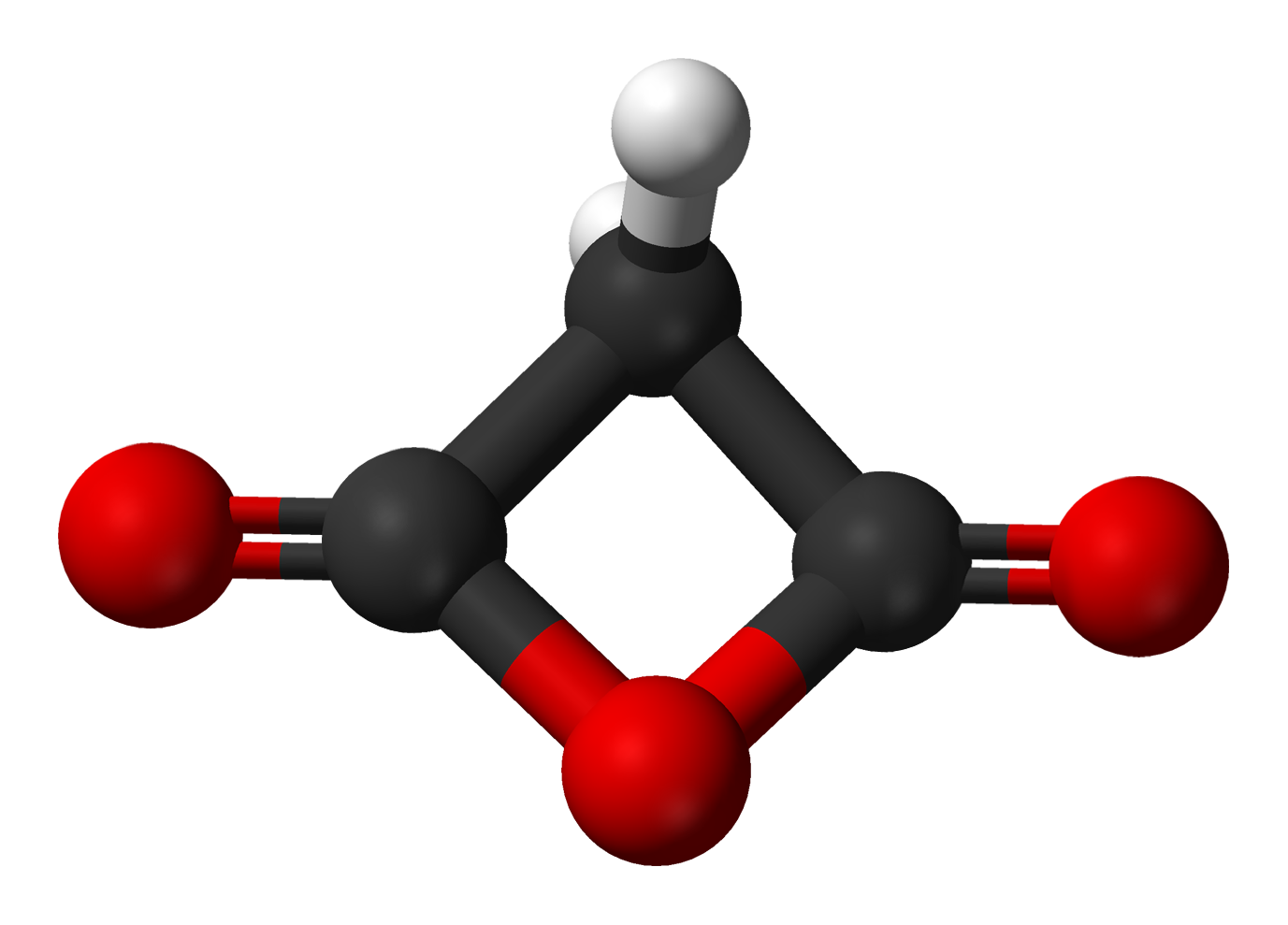
- Ball-and-stick model

Names
- Preferred IUPAC name Oxetane-2,4-dione
- Other names Malonic anhydride

Identifiers
CAS Number	15159-48-5
3D model (JSmol)	Interactive image
ChemSpider	8351595
PubChem CID	10176090
UNII	V8PB6RYA8G
CompTox Dashboard (EPA)	DTXSID00436365
- InChI: InChI=1S/C3H2O3/c4-2-1-3(5)6-2/h1H2 Key: KKHUSADXXDNRPW-UHFFFAOYSA-N; InChI=1/C3H2O3/c4-2-1-3(5)6-2/h1H2 Key: KKHUSADXXDNRPW-UHFFFAOYAB
- SMILES: O=C1OC(=O)C1

Properties
Chemical formula	C_{3}H_{2}O_{3}
Molar mass	86.046 g·mol^{−1}
- Except where otherwise noted, data are given for materials in their standard state (at 25 °C [77 °F], 100 kPa). verify (what is ?) Infobox references

Malonic anhydride or oxetane-2,4-dione is an organic compound with chemical formula C_{3}H_{2}O_{3} or CH_{2}(CO)_{2}O. It can be viewed as the anhydride of malonic acid, or a double ketone of oxetane.

Malonic anhydride was first synthesized in 1988 by ozonolysis of diketene. Some derivatives, such as 3,3-dimethyl-oxetane-2,4-dione, are known.

== See also ==
- Carbon suboxide (C_{3}O_{2}), an anhydride of malonic anhydride.
- 2-oxetanone, also called β-propiolactone
- 3-oxetanone
