= Silver oxalate =

Names
- IUPAC name Silver(I) ethanedioate
- Other names Silver Ethanedioate, Silver Salt; Argentous oxalate Silver(I) oxalate

Identifiers
CAS Number	533-51-7
3D model (JSmol)	Interactive image
ChemSpider	56153
ECHA InfoCard	100.007.791
EC Number	208-568-3
PubChem CID	62364
RTECS number	RO2900000
UNII	NE0L2ZGZ13
CompTox Dashboard (EPA)	DTXSID90201448
- InChI: InChI=1S/C2H2O4.2Ag/c3-1(4)2(5)6;;/h(H,3,4)(H,5,6);;/q;2*+1/p-2 Key: XNGYKPINNDWGGF-UHFFFAOYSA-L; InChI=1/C2H2O4.2Ag/c3-1(4)2(5)6;;/h(H,3,4)(H,5,6);;/q;2*+1/p-2 Key: XNGYKPINNDWGGF-NUQVWONBAW
- SMILES: [Ag+].[Ag+].[O-]C(=O)C([O-])=O

Properties
Chemical formula	Ag_{2}C_{2}O_{4}
Molar mass	303.755 g/mol
Appearance	white powder
Density	5.03 g/cm^{3}
Melting point	961.9 °C (1,763.4 °F; 1,235.0 K) (decomposes)
Boiling point	2,212 °C (4,014 °F; 2,485 K) at 1013.25 hPa
Solubility in water	3.270*10^{−3} g/100mL
Solubility product (K_{sp})	5.4×10^{−12}

Hazards
- Occupational safety and health (OHS/OSH)
Main hazards	Harmful if swallowed
- GHS labelling
Pictograms	(GHS01: Explosive) (GHS07: Exclamation mark) (GHS09: Environmental hazard)
Signal word	Danger
Hazard statements	H201, H302, H312, H410
Precautionary statements	P210, P230, P240, P250, P264, P270, P273, P280, P301+P317, P302+P352, P317, P321, P330, P362+P364, P370+P380, P372, P373, P391, P401, P501
Safety data sheet (SDS)	External MSDS
- Except where otherwise noted, data are given for materials in their standard state (at 25 °C [77 °F], 100 kPa). verify (what is ?) Infobox references

Silver oxalate is a silver salt of oxalic acid with the chemical formula Ag_{2}C_{2}O_{4}. It is sensitive to light, decomposing to metallic silver and carbon dioxide.

== Production ==
Silver oxalate is produced by the reaction between silver nitrate and oxalic acid, or from combining solutions of silver nitrate and sodium oxalate.

== Uses ==
It is commonly employed in experimental petrology to add carbon dioxide (CO_{2}) to experiments as it will break down to silver (Ag) and carbon dioxide under geologic conditions.

It is also a precursor to the production of silver nanoparticles.

== Safety ==
It is explosive upon heating around 140 °C (284 °F) and the dry material may explode when ground.

== See also ==
- Dioxane tetraketone
