= Dioxane tetraketone =

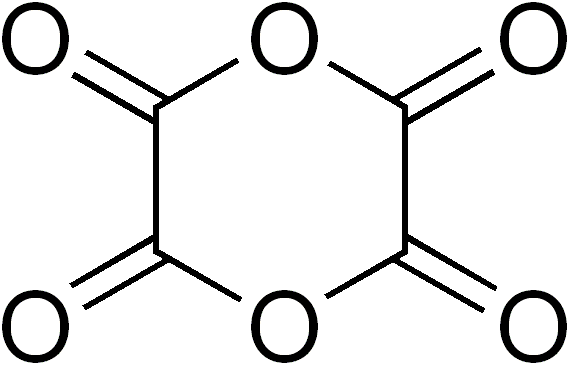

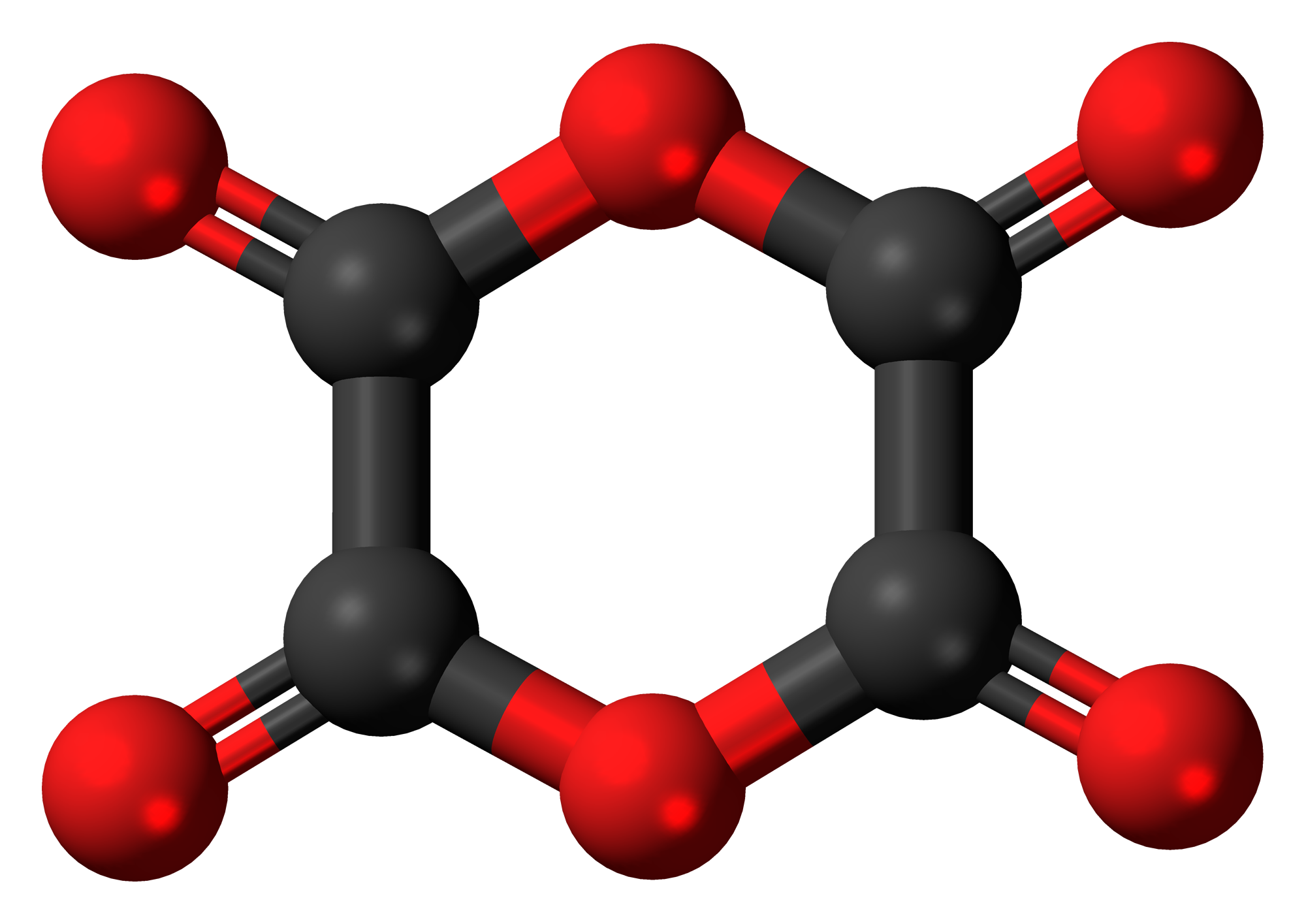

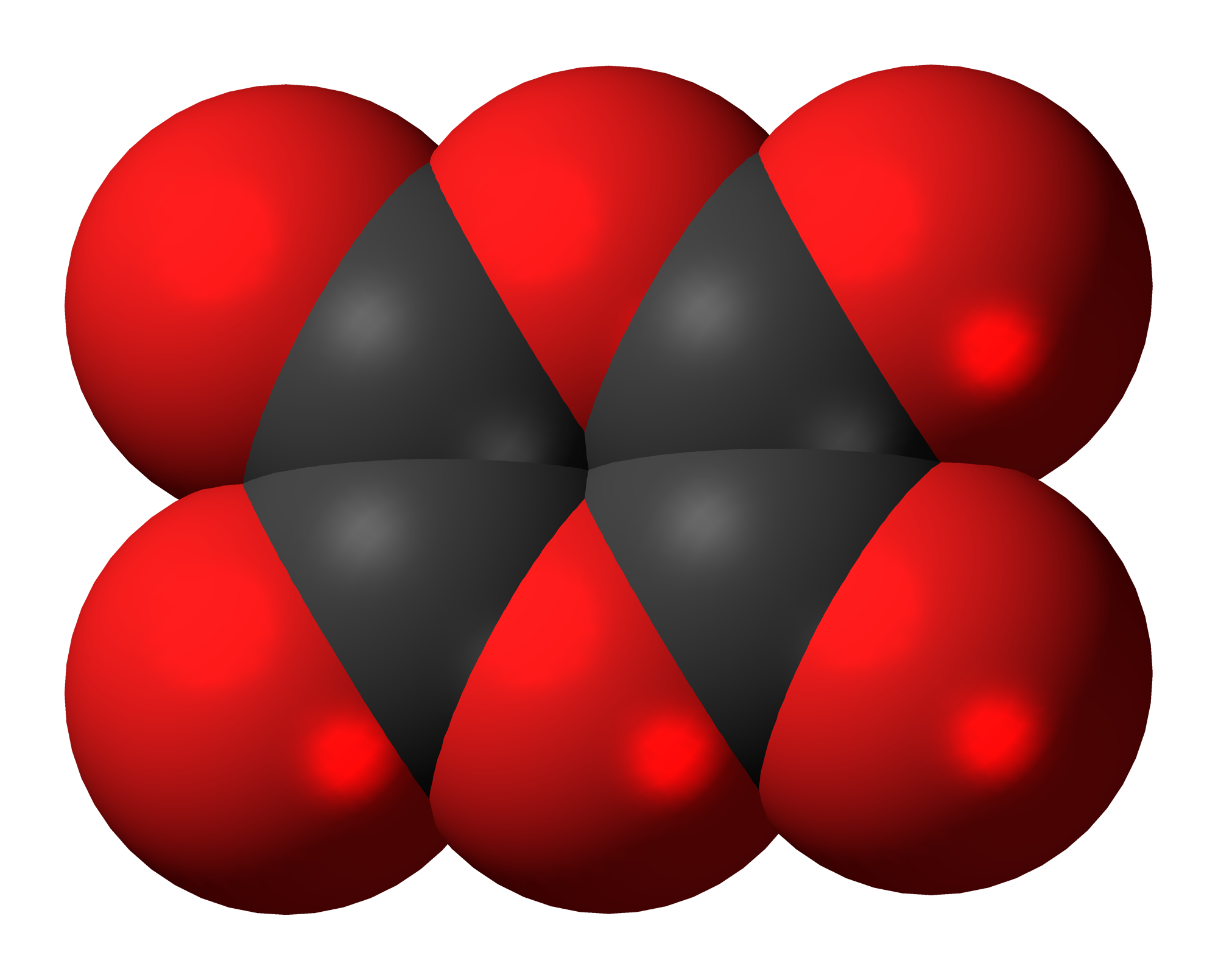

Names
- IUPAC name 1,4-Dioxane-2,3,5,6-tetrone

Identifiers
CAS Number	213967-57-8
3D model (JSmol)	Interactive image
ChemSpider	8710170
PubChem CID	10534779
CompTox Dashboard (EPA)	DTXSID40441312
- InChI: InChI=1S/C4O6/c5-1-2(6)10-4(8)3(7)9-1 Key: WBHICAWASPYOHL-UHFFFAOYSA-N
- SMILES: O=C(O1)C(OC(C1=O)=O)=O

Properties
Chemical formula	C_{4}O_{6}
Molar mass	144.038 g·mol^{−1}
- Except where otherwise noted, data are given for materials in their standard state (at 25 °C [77 °F], 100 kPa). verify (what is ?) Infobox references

Dioxane tetraketone (or 1,4-dioxane-2,3,5,6-tetrone) is an organic compound with the formula C_{4}O_{6}. It is an oxide of carbon (an oxocarbon), which can be viewed as the fourfold ketone of dioxane. It can also be viewed as the cyclic dimer of oxiranedione (C_{2}O_{3}), the hypothetical anhydride of oxalic acid.

In 1998, Paolo Strazzolini and others synthesized this compound by reacting oxalyl chloride (COCl)_{2} or the bromide (COBr)_{2} with a suspension of silver oxalate (Ag_{2}C_{2}O_{4}) in diethyl ether at −15 °C, followed by evaporation of the solvent at low temperature and pressure. The substance is stable when dissolved in ether and chloroform at −30 °C, but decomposes into a 1:1 mixture of carbon monoxide (CO) and carbon dioxide (CO_{2}) upon heating to 0 °C. The stability and conformation of the molecule were also analyzed by theoretical methods.

== See also ==
- 1,2-Dioxetanedione
