= PAZ-3205 =

Russian midibus

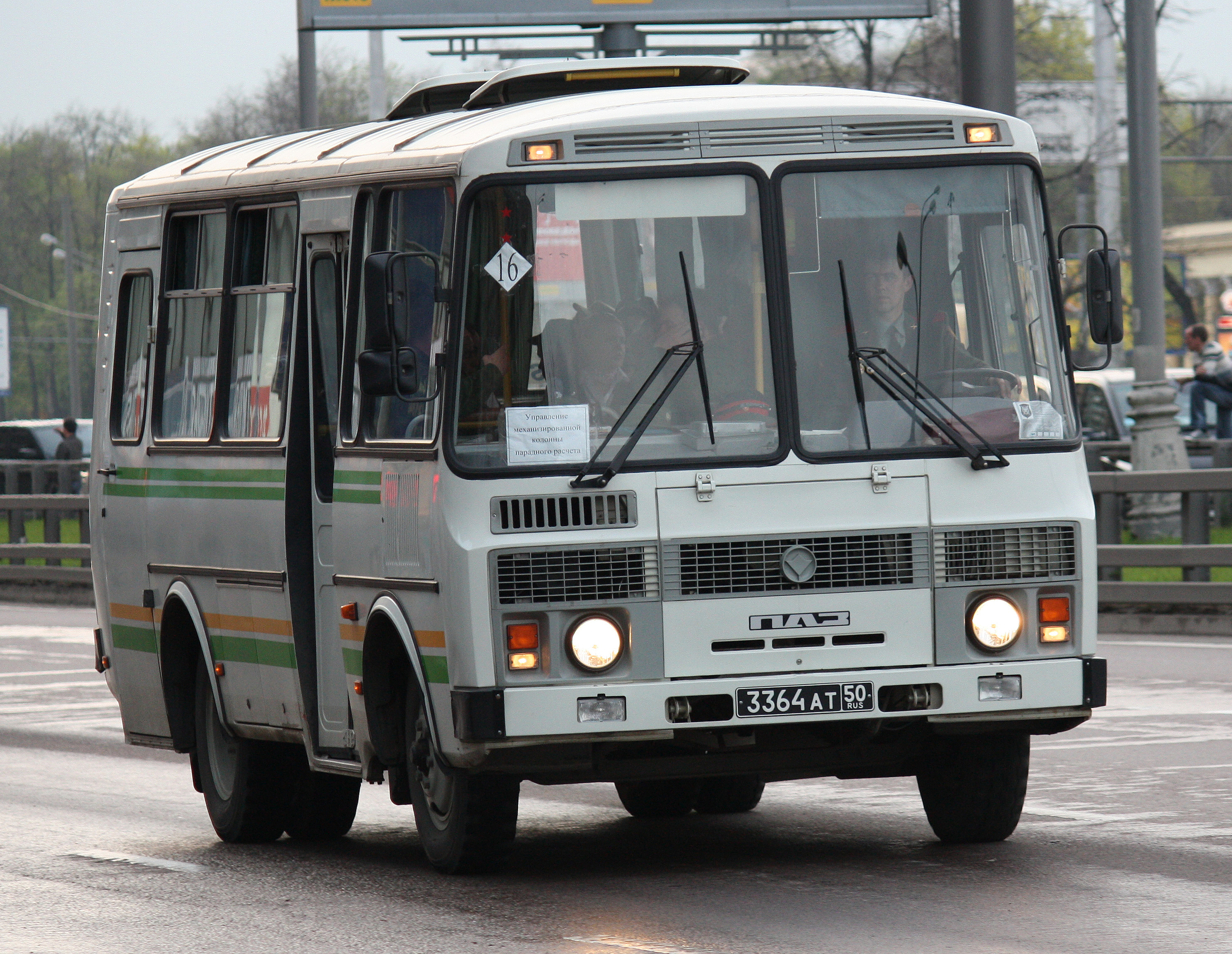
- PAZ-3205

Overview
- Manufacturer: Pavlovo Bus Factory
- Production: 1989–present

Body and chassis
- Floor type: Step entrance

Chronology
- Predecessor: PAZ-672
- Successor: PAZ-3204

PAZ-3205 is a common Soviet (or Russian) midibus model made by the Pavlovo Bus Factory. It is common in Russia and other Eastern European countries as both a low-intensity route public bus and a hearse. Model 3205 was launched on December 1, 1989, replacing a similarly specified PAZ-672 (a 1968 model).

PAZ buses are mainly used for urban Marshrutki, rural and regional services. Current PAZ buses are equipped with 120-140 horsepower Russian (ZMZ) or Belarusian (MMZ) diesel or petrol Euro III emission compliant engines, and have maximum speed of 90 km/h. PAZ is also offering installation of Hino Motors, Cummins, Andoria and BAMO imported engines for rear wheel drive models.

In 2013, a facelifted model entered production.

== Variants ==
Major current modifications include:

Model	Engine h.p.	Wheelbase mm	Dimensions mm	Weight empty/gross kg	Passengers standing/sitting	Number of passenger doors
PAZ-3205 (base, single accordion door)	130	3600	7000×2520×2960	5170/8155	36/28	One, 726 mm wide
PAZ-32051 (base, double accordion doors)	130	3600	7000×2520×2960	5130/8185	35/24	Two, 726 mm wide each
PAZ-3206 (all-wheel drive)	130	3600	7000×2520×3105	5395/7240	-/28	One, 726 mm wide
PAZ-4234 (stretched wheelbase)	136	4345	8165×2520×2960	5860/9485	50/30	Two, 726 mm wide each

PAZ buses are commonly employed by firefighters and police - for ordinary busing and as "mobile headquarters". PAZ funeral buses have rear door, floor rails and safety straps for carrying a coffin in the rear. Passenger seats are arranged in long benches along the sides, facing the coffin.

== Production ==
Production of PAZ-3205 (with all derivatives) in the 2000s (decade) was steadily rising, accounting for at least 80% of PAZ output:

Year	2000	2001	2002	2003	2004	2005	2006	2007	2008
Units				10,190	10,520				15,297 (est.)

== Gallery ==
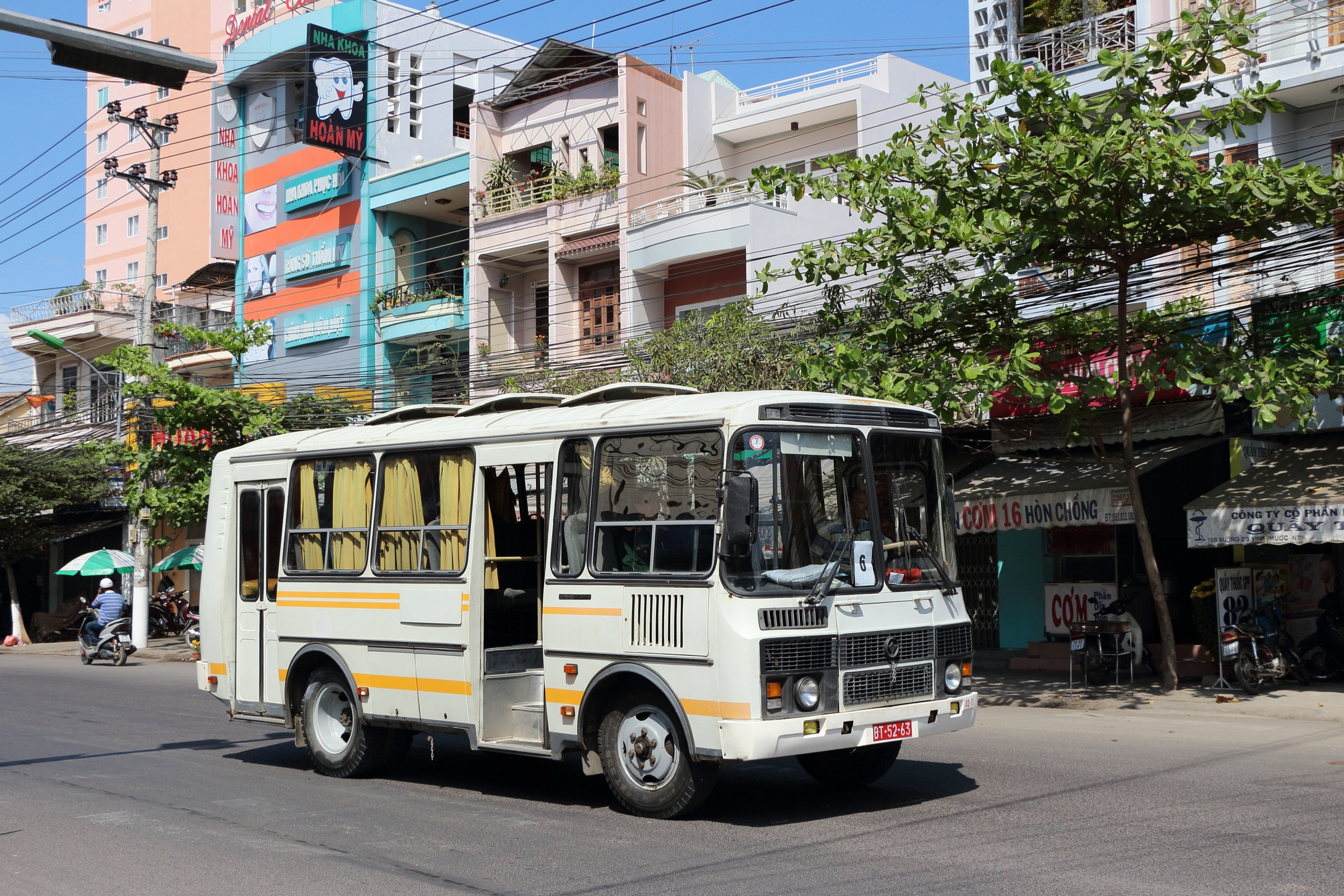
Double-door version

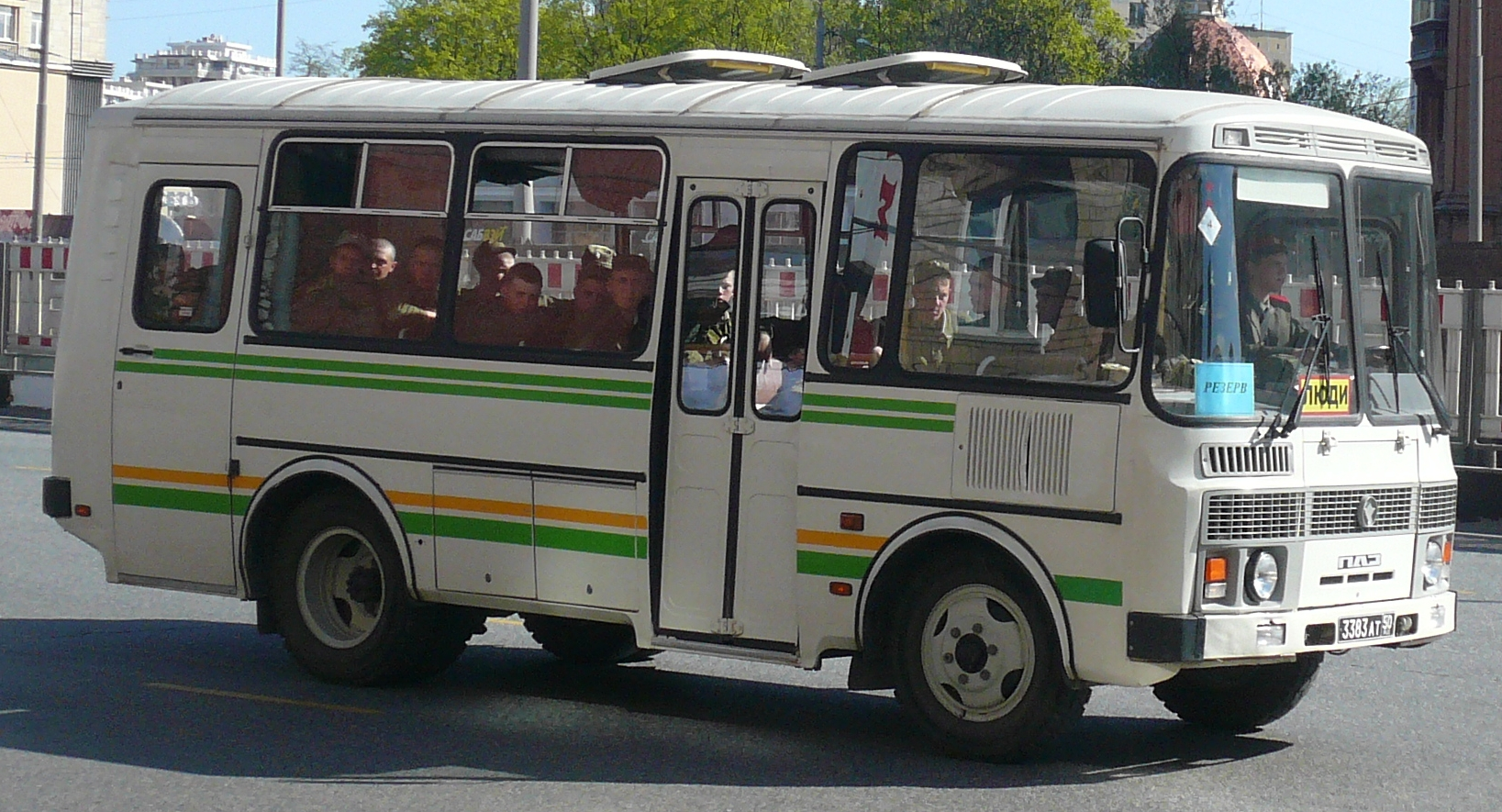
Single-door version

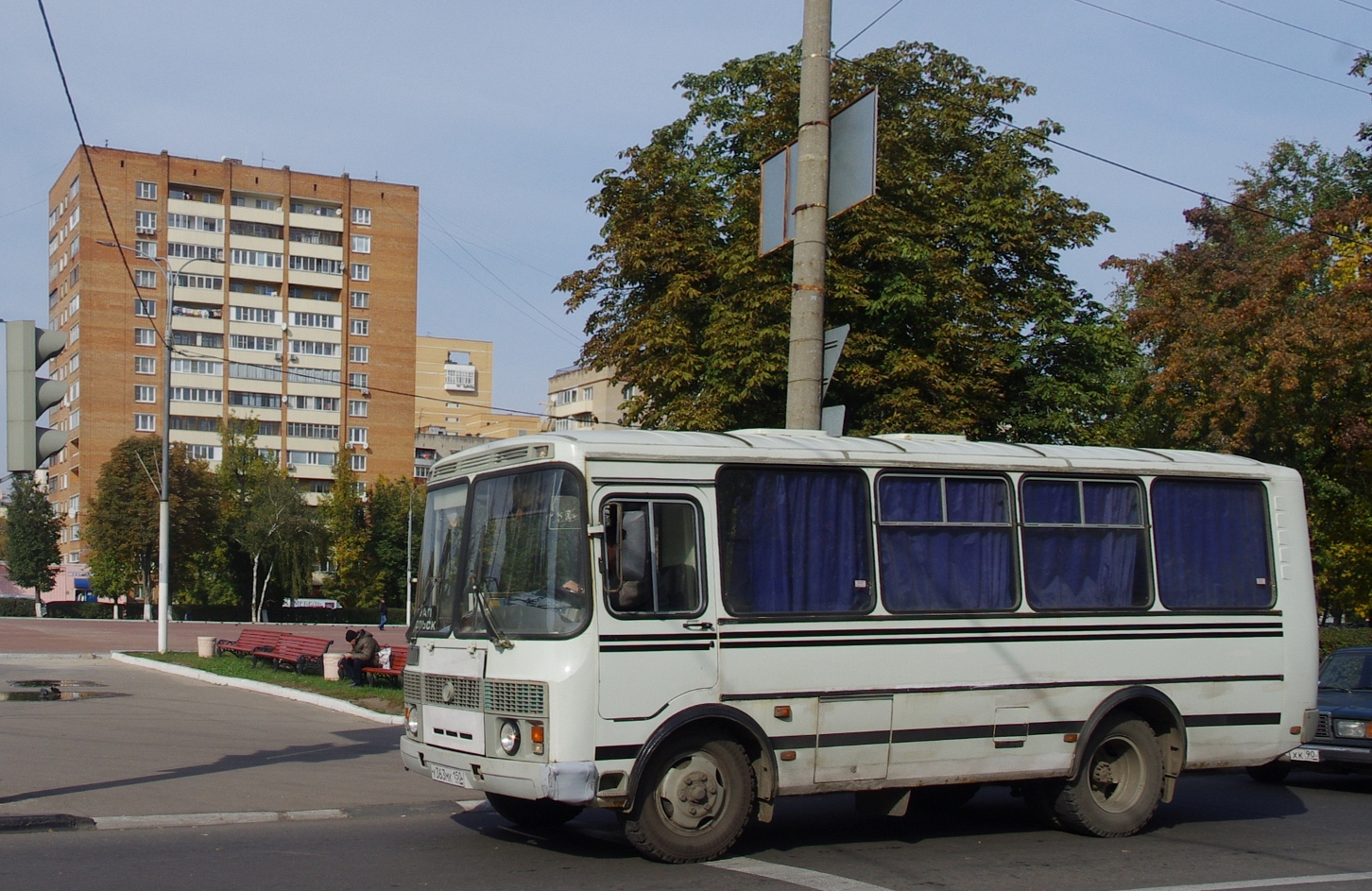
Funeral bus

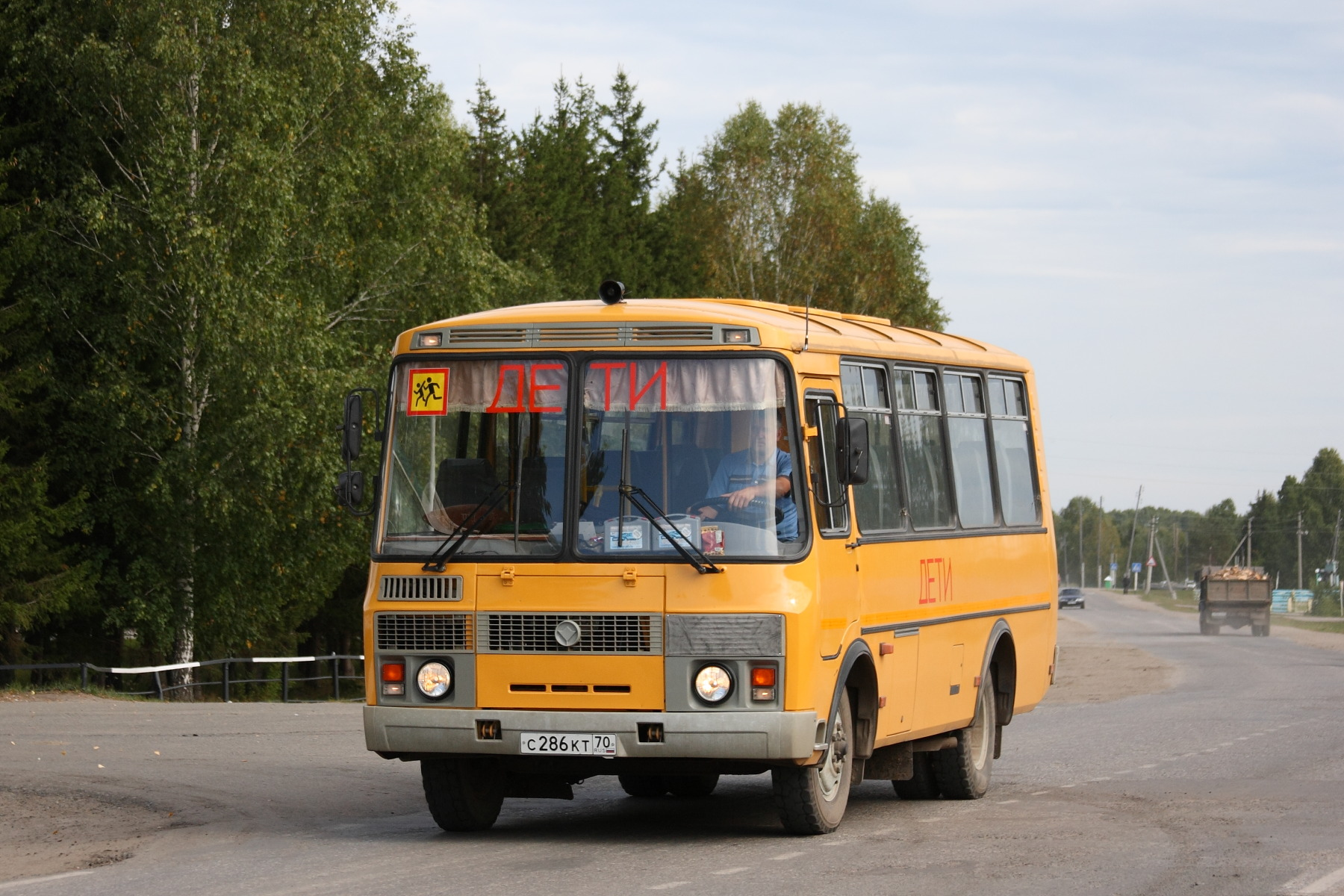
School bus

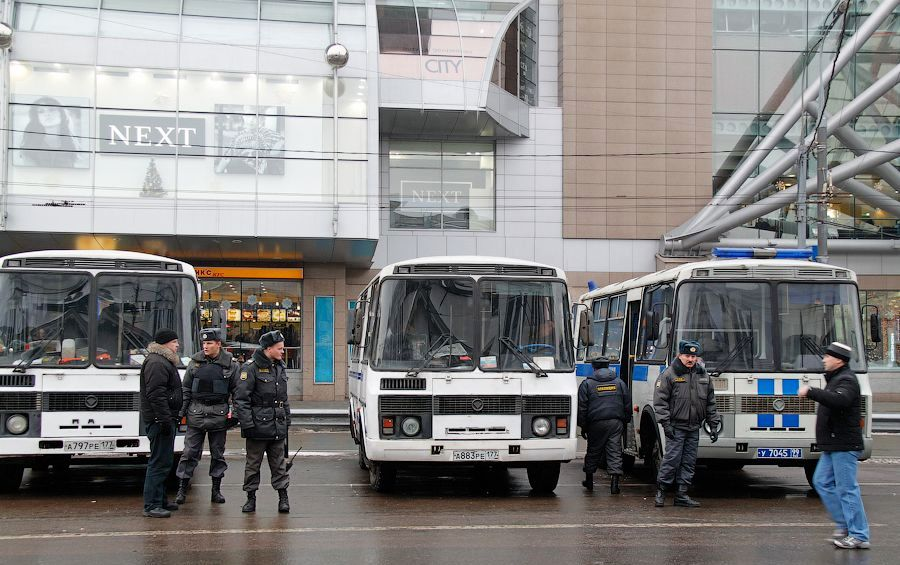
Moscow Police buses

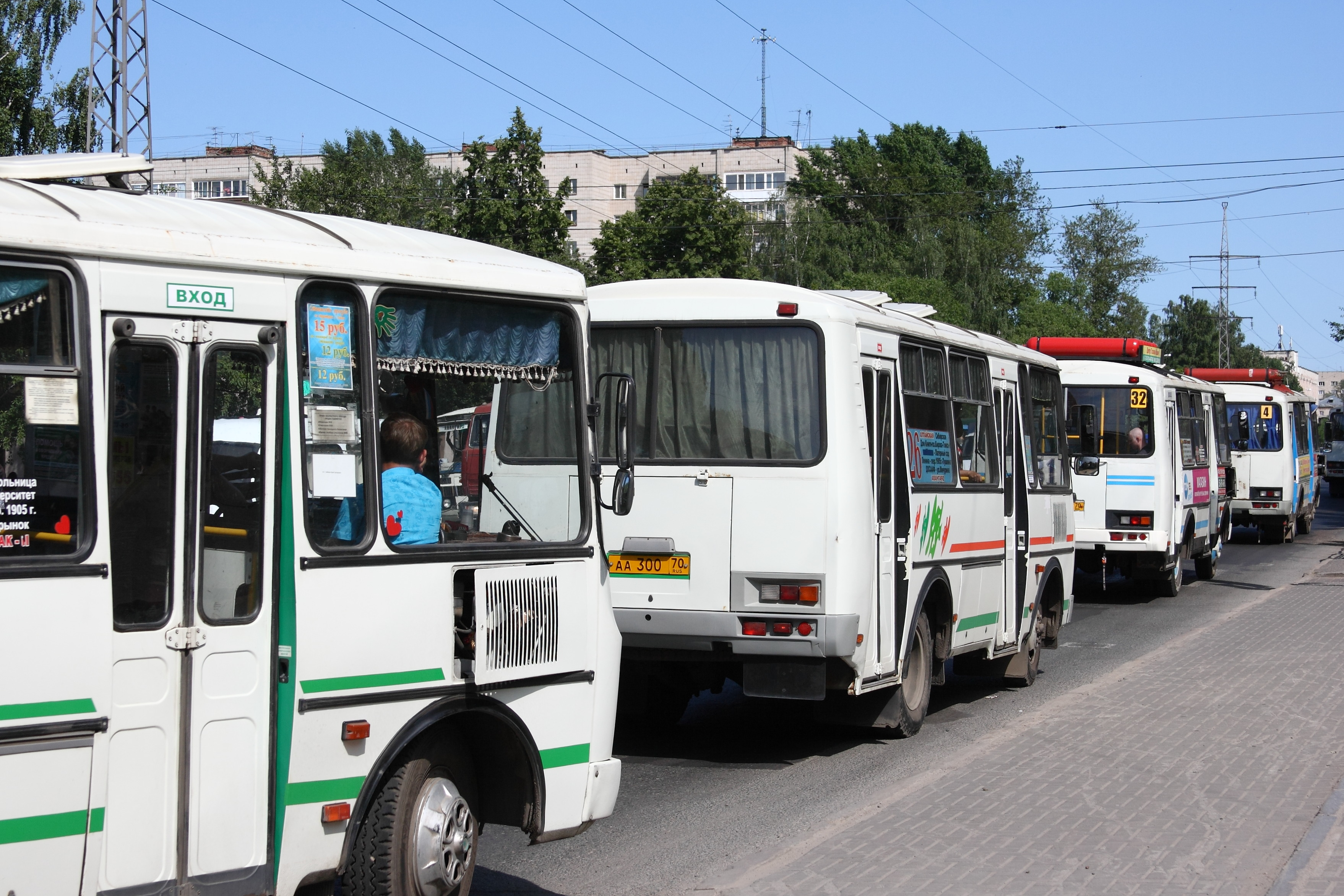
Double-door buses in Tomsk. Red gas cylinders uses for methane gas fuel

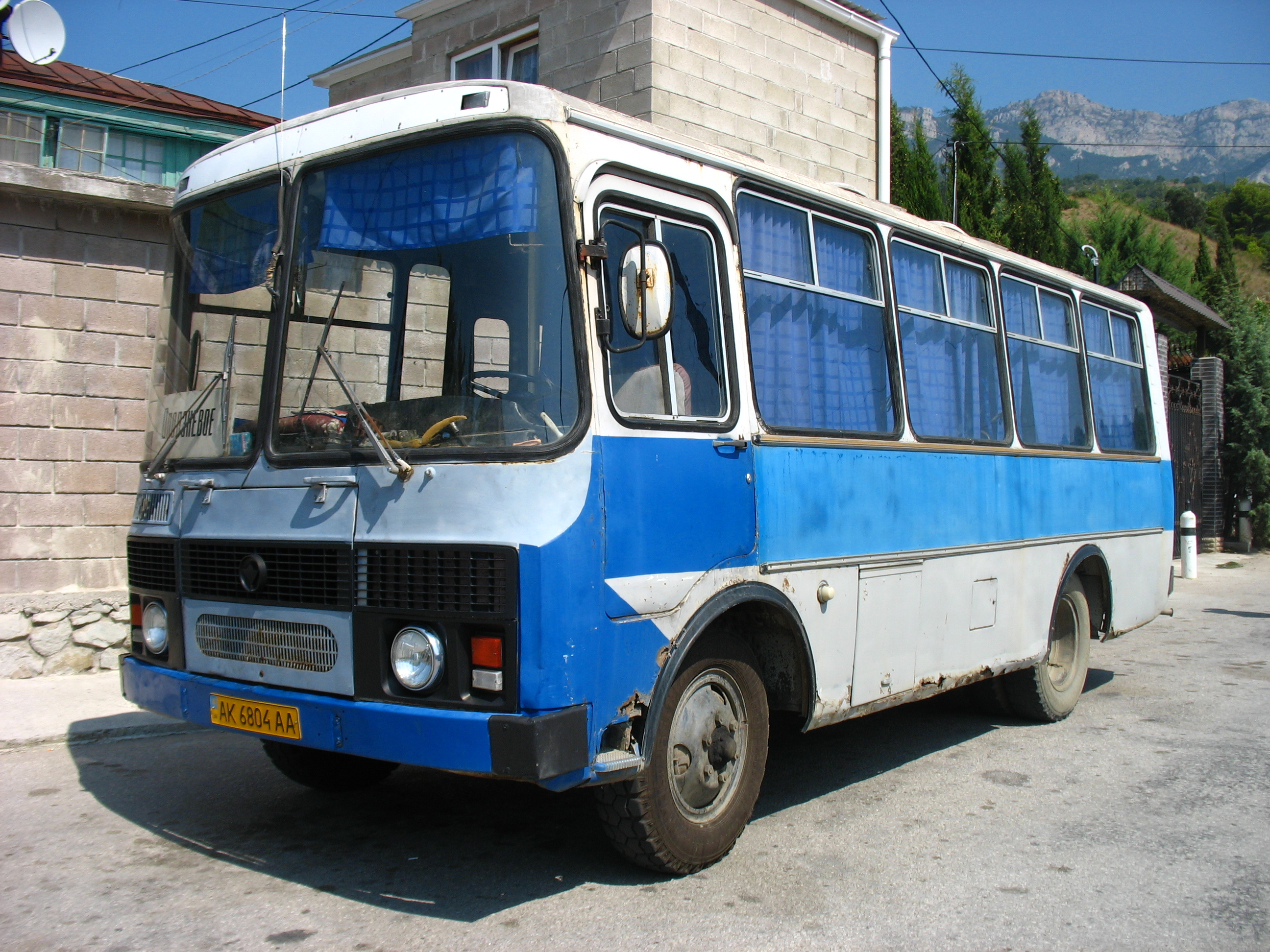
Old version (before restyled) in Crimea
