= Methyloxiranone =

α-Propiolactone
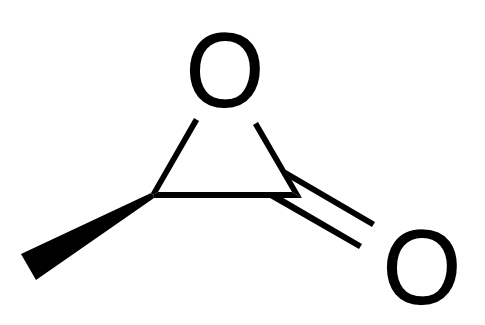
(R)-Methyloxiranone
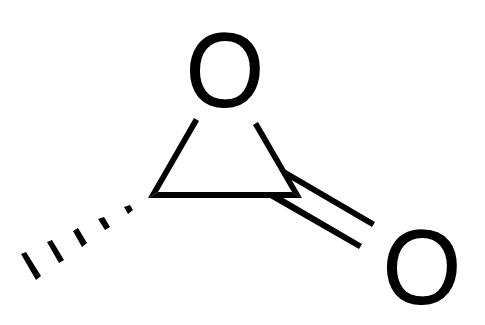
(S)-Methyloxiranone

Names
- IUPAC name 3-Methyloxiran-2-one
- Other names α-Propiolactone; 2-Methyl-α-lactone

Identifiers
CAS Number	50403-36-6
3D model (JSmol)	Interactive image
ChemSpider	74180244
PubChem CID	15857753
CompTox Dashboard (EPA)	DTXSID301336180
- InChI: InChI=1S/C3H4O2/c1-2-3(4)5-2/h2H,1H3 Key: YCHXNMPJFFEIJG-UHFFFAOYSA-N
- SMILES: CC1C(=O)O1

Properties
Chemical formula	C_{3}H_{4}O_{2}
Molar mass	72.06 g mol^{−1}
- Except where otherwise noted, data are given for materials in their standard state (at 25 °C [77 °F], 100 kPa). verify (what is ?) Infobox references

Methyloxiranone or α-propiolactone is a chemical compound of the lactone family, with a three-membered ring. It is a stable product which can be obtained from the 2-bromopropionate anion. It is an intermediate in the decomposition of 2-chloropropionic acid in the gas phase.

== See also ==
- β-Propiolactone
- Acetolactone
