= Vernolepin =

Names
- Preferred IUPAC name (3aR,4S,5aR,9aR,9bR)-5a-Ethenyl-4-hydroxy-3,9-dimethylideneoctahydro-2H-furo[2,3-f][2]benzopyran-2,8(3H)-dione
- Other names Vernolepin

Identifiers
CAS Number	18542-37-5
3D model (JSmol)	Interactive image
ChemSpider	390780
KEGG	C09582
PubChem CID	442322
UNII	6640X1BVDX
CompTox Dashboard (EPA)	DTXSID6075146
- InChI: InChI=1S/C15H16O5/c1-4-15-5-9(16)10-7(2)14(18)20-12(10)11(15)8(3)13(17)19-6-15/h4,9-12,16H,1-3,5-6H2/t9-,10+,11+,12-,15+/m0/s1 Key: IFYQXAXVZGMFNW-MVIRXUPPSA-N; InChI=1/C15H16O5/c1-4-15-5-9(16)10-7(2)14(18)20-12(10)11(15)8(3)13(17)19-6-15/h4,9-12,16H,1-3,5-6H2/t9-,10+,11+,12-,15+/m0/s1 Key: IFYQXAXVZGMFNW-MVIRXUPPBC
- SMILES: C=C[C@]12C[C@@H]([C@@H]3[C@@H]([C@H]1C(=C)C(=O)OC2)OC(=O)C3=C)O

Properties
Chemical formula	C_{15}H_{16}O_{5}
Melting point	179 to 180 °C (354 to 356 °F; 452 to 453 K)
- Except where otherwise noted, data are given for materials in their standard state (at 25 °C [77 °F], 100 kPa). Infobox references

Vernolepin is a sesquiterpene lactone isolated from the dried fruit of Vernonia amygdalina. It shows platelet anti-aggregating properties and is also an irreversible DNA polymerase inhibitor, hence may have antitumor properties.
