= 3-Oxetanone =

Skeletal formula
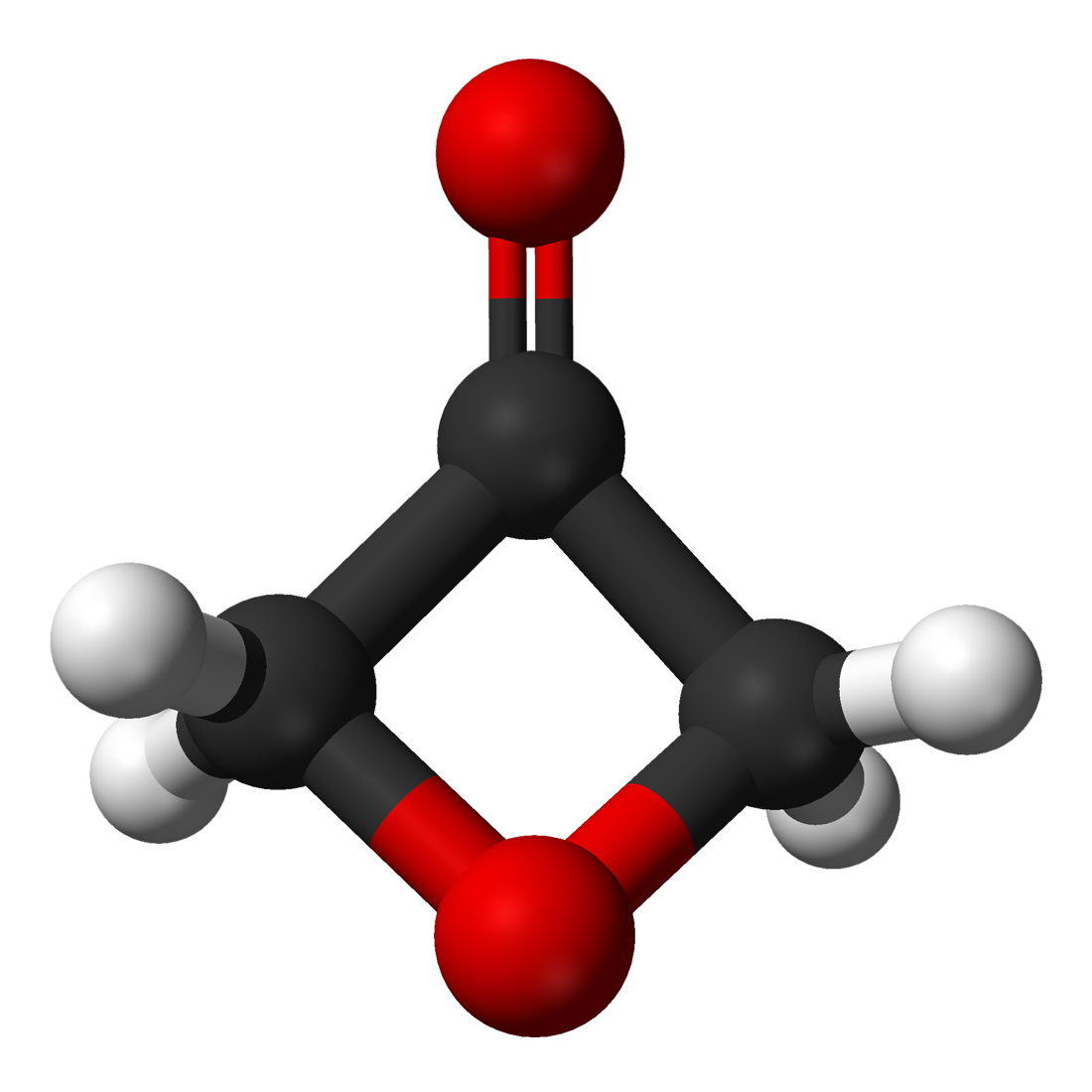
Ball-and-stick model

Names
- Preferred IUPAC name Oxetan-3-one
- Other names 1,3-Epoxy-2-propanone; 1,3-Epoxypropanone; 1,3-Epoxy-2-propan-2-one

Identifiers
CAS Number	6704-31-0
3D model (JSmol)	Interactive image
ChemSpider	11457528
ECHA InfoCard	100.190.619
PubChem CID	15024254
UNII	TGB3B74HZP
CompTox Dashboard (EPA)	DTXSID80567101
- InChI: InChI=1S/C3H4O2/c4-3-1-5-2-3/h1-2H2 Key: ROADCYAOHVSOLQ-UHFFFAOYSA-N; InChI=1/C3H4O2/c4-3-1-5-2-3/h1-2H2 Key: ROADCYAOHVSOLQ-UHFFFAOYAK
- SMILES: O=C1COC1

Properties
Chemical formula	C_{3}H_{4}O_{2}
Molar mass	72.06 g/mol
Density	1.124 g/cm^{3}
Boiling point	140 °C (284 °F; 413 K)

Hazards
Flash point	53 °C (127 °F; 326 K)
- Except where otherwise noted, data are given for materials in their standard state (at 25 °C [77 °F], 100 kPa). verify (what is ?) Infobox references

3-Oxetanone, also called oxetan-3-one or 1,3-epoxy-2-propanone, is a chemical compound with formula C_{3}H_{4}O_{2}. It is the ketone of oxetane, and an isomer of β-propiolactone.

3-Oxetanone is a liquid at room temperature, that boils at 140 °C. It is a specialty chemical, used for research in the synthesis of other oxetanes of pharmacological interest. Oxetan-3-one also has been the object of theoretical studies.

== See also ==
- Malonic anhydride or oxetane-2,4-dione
- 1,2-dioxetanedione
