= 3,3-Bis(chloromethyl)oxetane =

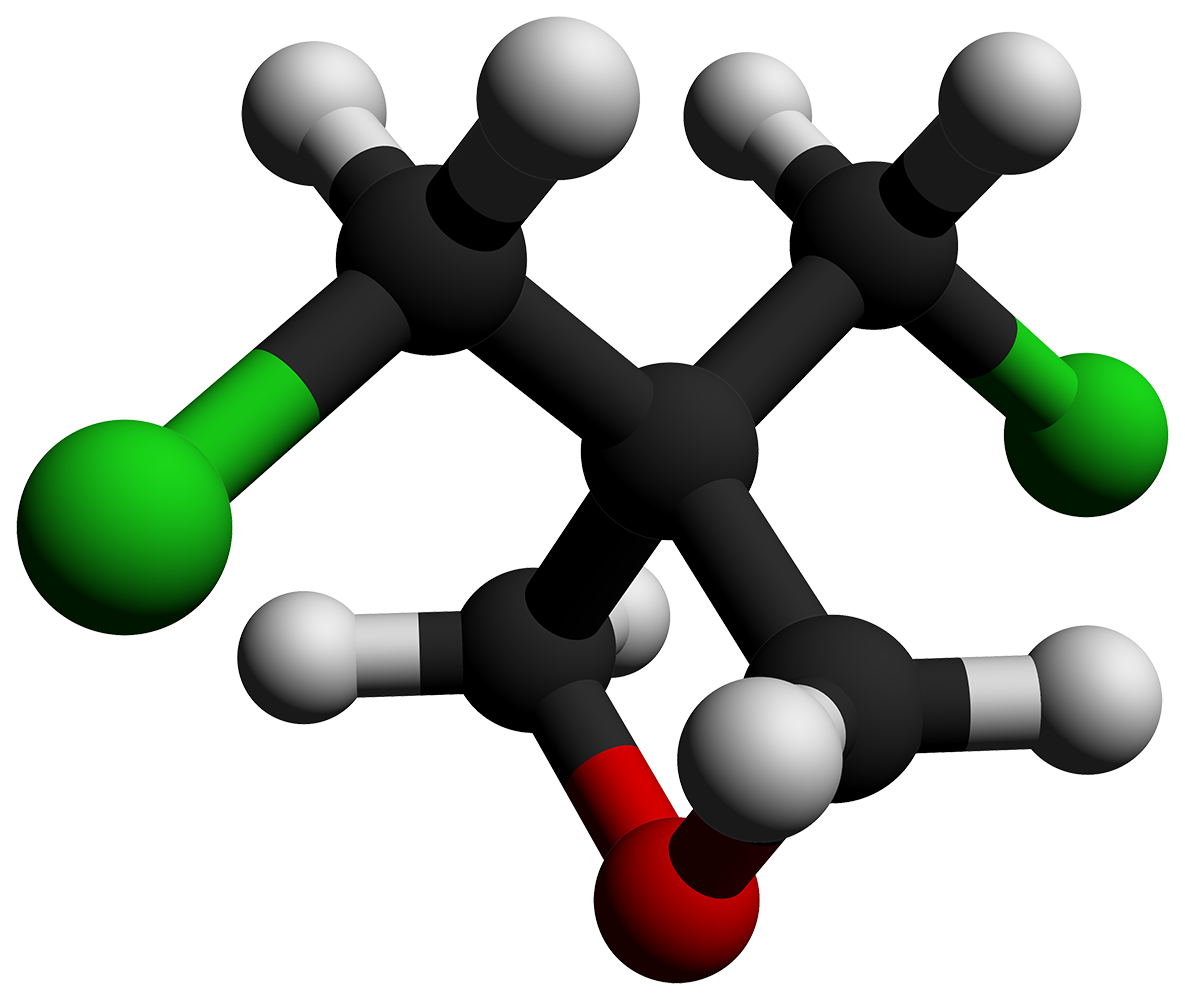

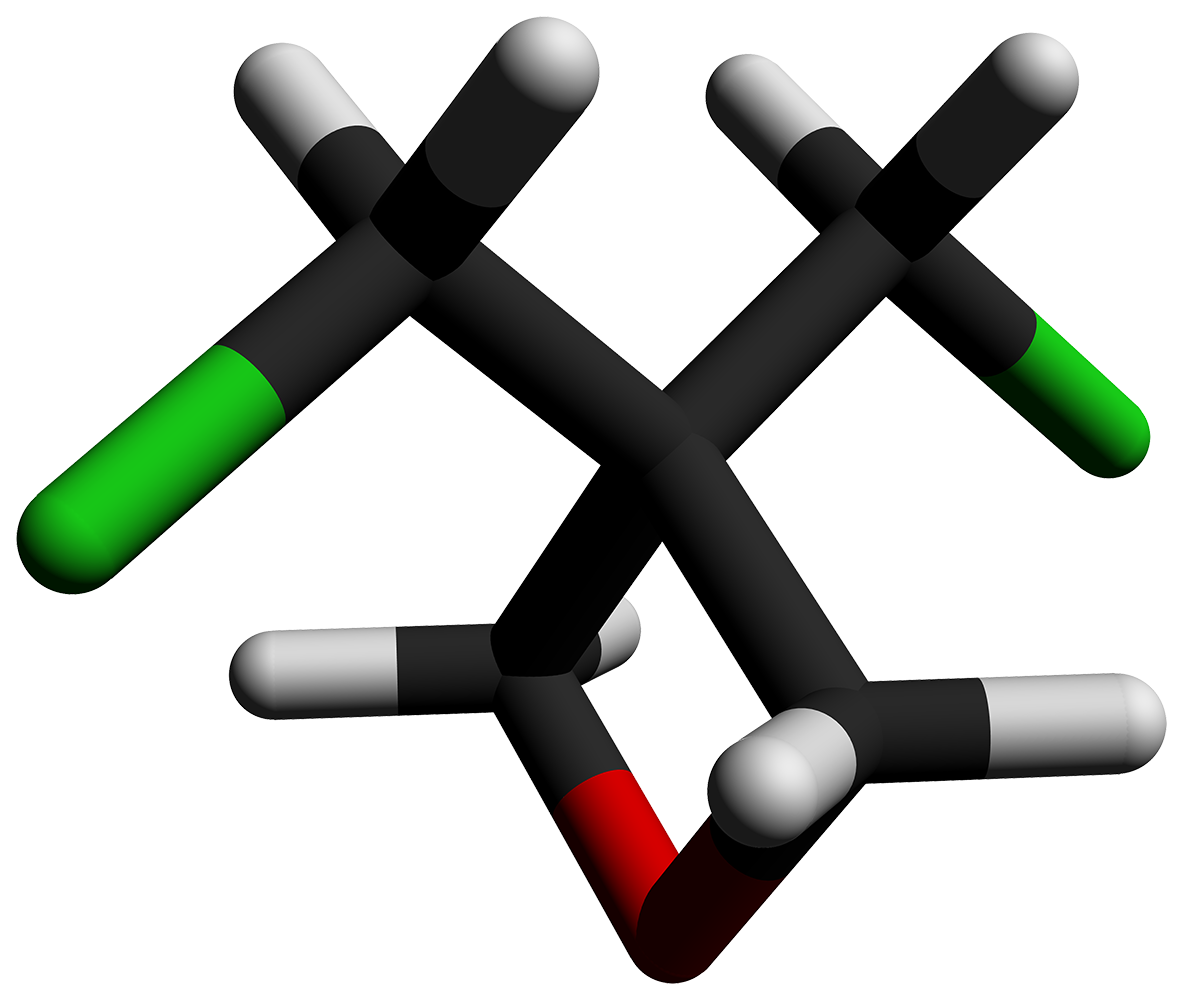

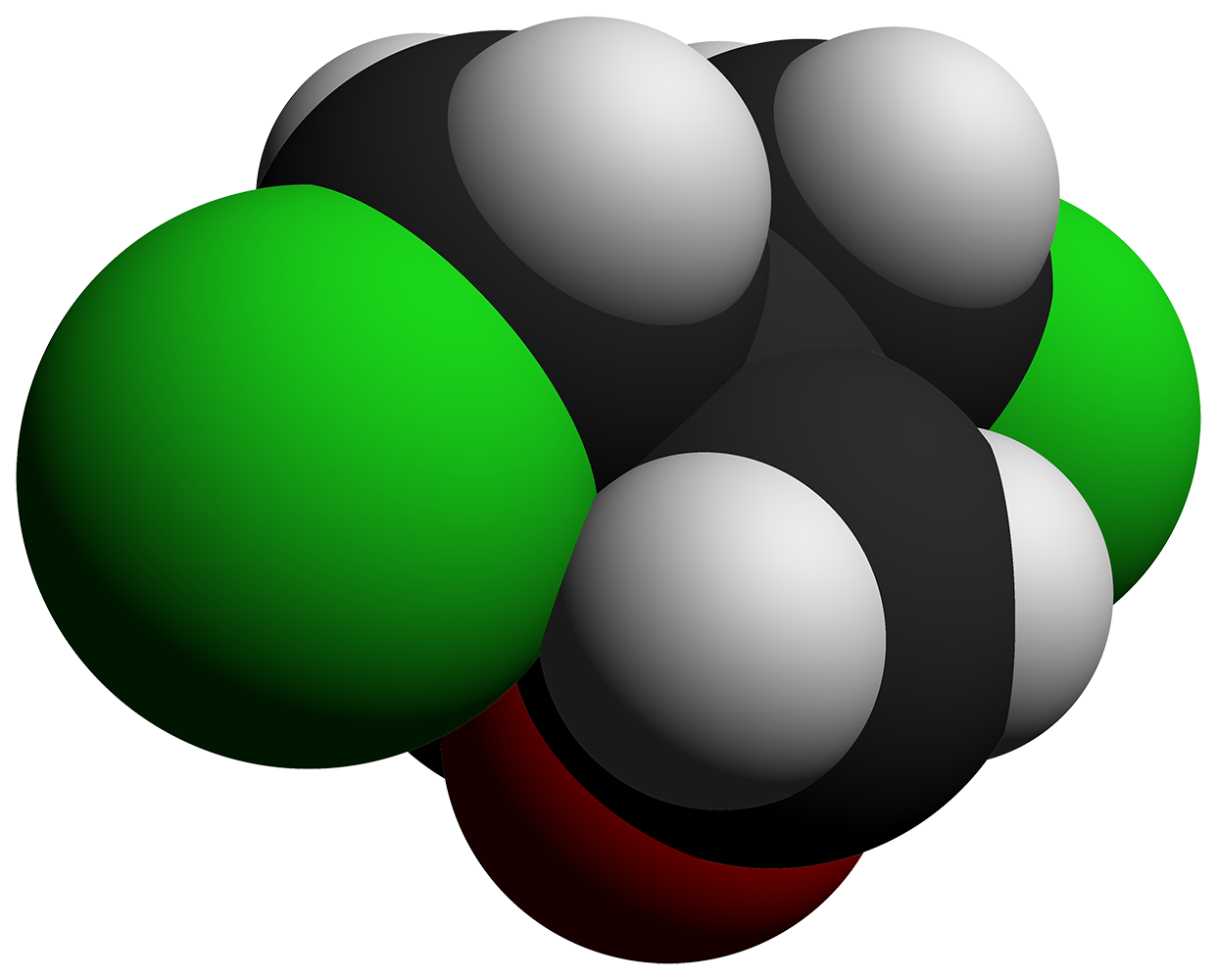

Names
- Preferred IUPAC name 3,3-Bis(chloromethyl)oxetane
- Other names 3,3-Dichloromethyloxycyclobutane; BCMO

Identifiers
CAS Number	78-71-7
3D model (JSmol)	Interactive image
ChemSpider	6302
ECHA InfoCard	100.001.033
EC Number	201-136-5
PubChem CID	6550
UNII	N12TP81ATK
CompTox Dashboard (EPA)	DTXSID9058816
- InChI: InChI=1S/C5H8Cl2O/c6-1-5(2-7)3-8-4-5/h1-4H2 Key: CXURGFRDGROIKG-UHFFFAOYSA-N; InChI=1/C5H8Cl2O/c6-1-5(2-7)3-8-4-5/h1-4H2 Key: CXURGFRDGROIKG-UHFFFAOYAZ
- SMILES: ClCC1(CCl)COC1

Properties
Chemical formula	C_{5}H_{8}Cl_{2}O
Molar mass	155.02 g·mol^{−1}
Appearance	Black or olive green solid
Density	1.295 g/cm^{3}
Melting point	18.9 °C (66.0 °F; 292.0 K)
Boiling point	95 °C (203 °F; 368 K)

Hazards
- GHS labelling
Pictograms	(GHS07: Exclamation mark) (GHS06: Toxic)
Signal word	Warning
Hazard statements	H302, H315, H319, H330, H335
Precautionary statements	P260, P264, P270, P271, P280, P284, P301+P312, P302+P352, P304+P340, P305+P351+P338, P310, P320, P321, P330, P332+P313, P337+P313, P362+P364, P403+P233, P405, P501
NFPA 704 (fire diamond)	3 1 0
- Except where otherwise noted, data are given for materials in their standard state (at 25 °C [77 °F], 100 kPa). Infobox references

3,3-Bis(chloromethyl)oxetane (BCMO) is an intermediate in the synthesis of poly(bis(azidomethyl)oxetane (PolyBAMO), an energetic polymer that is being studied for use as a propellant binder for rocket fuel.

It is classified as an extremely hazardous substance in the United States. It can cause kidney damage, lacrimation, and somnolence if consumed.

== Preparation and reaction ==
BCMO is formed in solution via cyclization of pentaerythritol trichlorohydrin with a non-organic base like sodium hydroxide.

BAMO can be formed from a reaction of BCMO with sodium azide. This reaction takes place in an alkaline solution with tetrabutyl ammonium bromide, which acts as a phase transfer catalyst.
