= Β-Propiolactone =

β-Propiolactone
- Skeletal formula

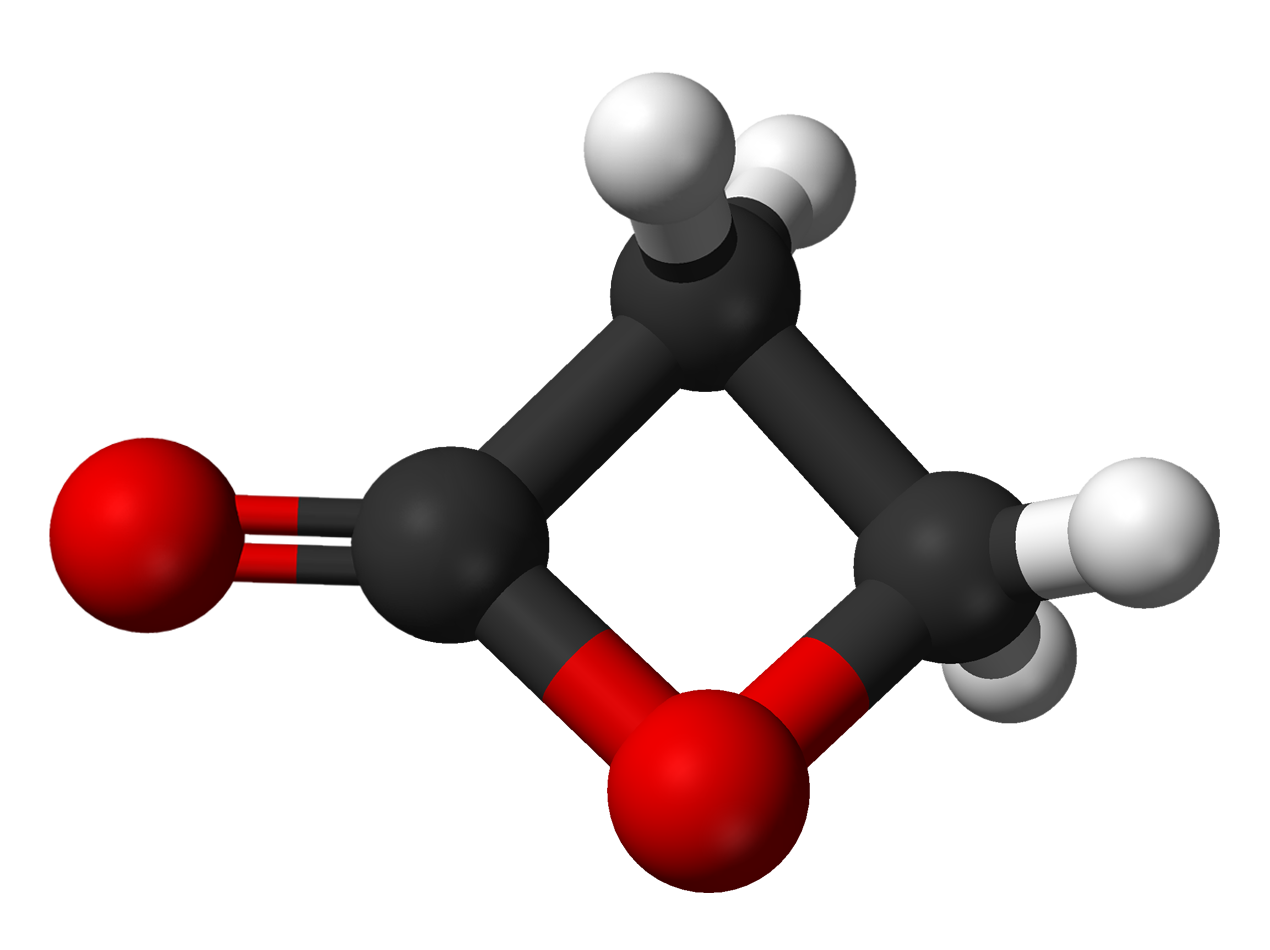
- Balla-and-stick model

Names
- Preferred IUPAC name Oxetan-2-one
- Other names Propiolactone; 2-Oxetanone; 3-Hydroxypropanoic acid lactone

Identifiers
CAS Number	57-57-8
3D model (JSmol)	Interactive image
ChEBI	CHEBI:49073
ChEMBL	ChEMBL1200627
ChemSpider	2275
DrugBank	DB09348
ECHA InfoCard	100.000.309
EC Number	200-340-1
KEGG	D05630
PubChem CID	2365
RTECS number	RQ7350000
UNII	6RC3ZT4HB0
UN number	2810
CompTox Dashboard (EPA)	DTXSID8021197
- InChI: InChI=1S/C3H4O2/c4-3-1-2-5-3/h1-2H2 Key: VEZXCJBBBCKRPI-UHFFFAOYSA-N; InChI=1/C3H4O2/c4-3-1-2-5-3/h1-2H2 Key: VEZXCJBBBCKRPI-UHFFFAOYAQ
- SMILES: O=C1OCC1

Properties
Chemical formula	C_{3}H_{4}O_{2}
Molar mass	72.063 g·mol^{−1}
Appearance	Colorless liquid
Odor	slightly sweet
Density	1.1460 g/cm^{3}
Melting point	−33.4 °C (−28.1 °F; 239.8 K)
Boiling point	162 °C (324 °F; 435 K) (decomposes)
Solubility in water	37 g/100 mL
Solubility in organic solvents	Miscible
Vapor pressure	3 mmHg (25°C)
Refractive index (n_{D})	1.4131

Hazards
- GHS labelling
Pictograms	(GHS06: Toxic) (GHS07: Exclamation mark) (GHS08: Health hazard)
Signal word	Danger
Hazard statements	H315, H319, H330, H350
Precautionary statements	P201, P202, P260, P264, P271, P280, P281, P284, P302+P352, P304+P340, P305+P351+P338, P308+P313, P310, P320, P321, P332+P313, P337+P313, P362, P403+P233, P405, P501
Flash point	74 °C; 165 °F; 347 K
Explosive limits	2.9%-?
- NIOSH (US health exposure limits)
PEL (Permissible)	OSHA-Regulated carcinogen
REL (Recommended)	Ca
IDLH (Immediate danger)	Ca [N.D.]
- Except where otherwise noted, data are given for materials in their standard state (at 25 °C [77 °F], 100 kPa). verify (what is ?) Infobox references

β-Propiolactone, often simply called propiolactone, is an organic compound with the formula CH_{2}CH_{2}CO_{2}. It is a member of the lactone family, with a four-membered ring. It is a colorless liquid with a slightly sweet odor, highly soluble in water and organic solvents. The carcinogenicity of this compound has limited its commercial applications.

== Production ==
β-Propiolactone is prepared industrially by the reaction of formaldehyde and ethenone in the presence of aluminium- or zinc chloride as catalyst:

In the research laboratory, propiolactones have been produced by the carbonylation of epoxides.

== Reactions and applications ==
It reacts with many nucleophiles in a ring-opening reactions. With water hydrolysis occurs to produce 3-hydroxypropionic acid (hydracryclic acid). Ammonia gives the β-alanine, which is a commercial process.

Propiolactone was once widely produced as an intermediate in the production of acrylic acid and its esters. That application has been largely displaced in favor of safer and less expensive alternatives. β-Propiolactone is an excellent sterilizing and sporicidal agent, but its carcinogenicity precludes that use. It is used to inactivate a wide variety of viruses, for instance the influenza virus, as a step in vaccine production. The principal use of propiolactone is an intermediate in the synthesis of other chemical compounds.

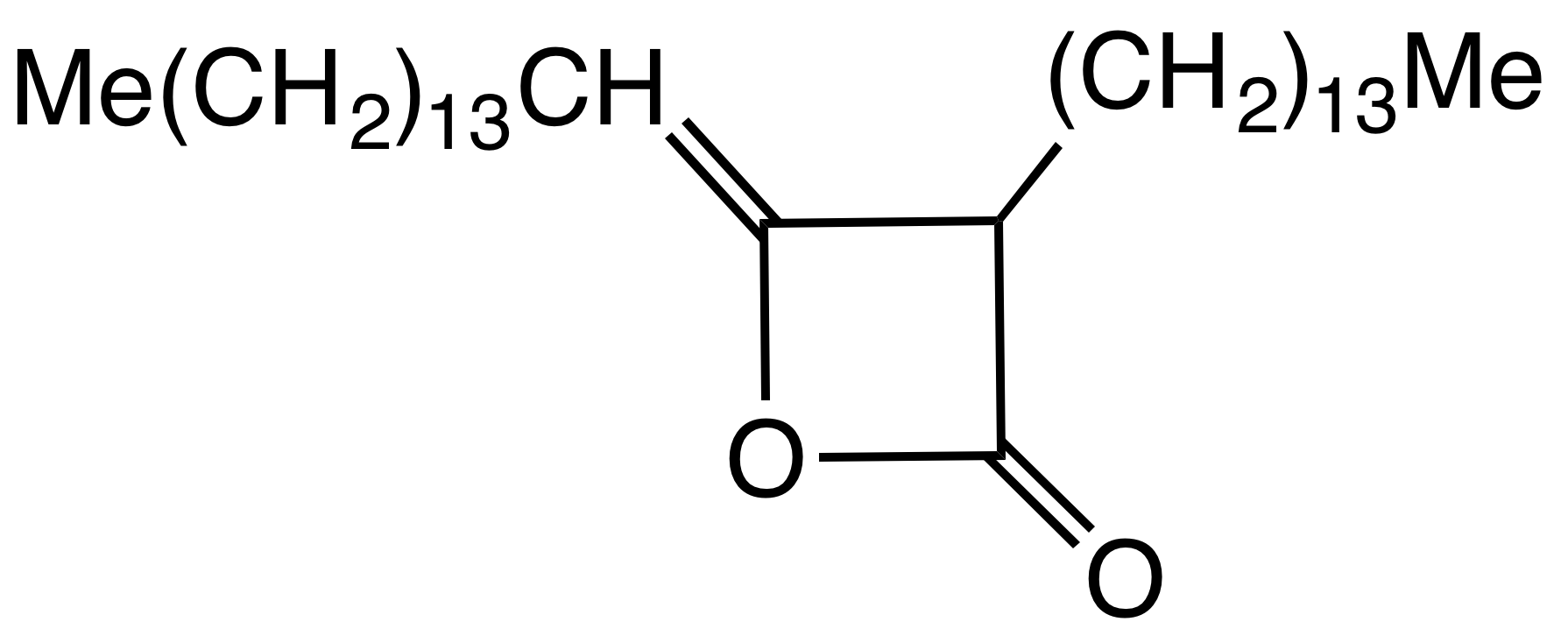
Structure of an alkyl ketene dimer (AKD), a propiolactone derivative that is used in papermaking.

== Safety ==
β-Propiolactone is "reasonably anticipated to be a human carcinogen" (IARC, 1999). It is one of 13 "OSHA-regulated carcinogens," chemicals regarded occupational carcinogens by the U.S. Occupational Safety and Health Administration, despite not having an established permissible exposure limit.

== See also ==
- 3-Oxetanone, an isomer of β-propiolactone
- Malonic anhydride (2,4-oxetanone)
- α-Propiolactone
