= List of compounds with carbon number 9 =

This is a partial list of molecules that contain 9 carbon atoms.

Chemical formula	Synonyms	CAS number
C_{9}HF_{17}O_{2}	perfluorononanoic acid	375-95-1
C_{9}H_{2}Cl_{6}O_{3}	chlorendic anhydride	115-27-5
C_{9}H_{4}Cl_{3}NO_{2}S	folpet	133-07-3
C_{9}H_{4}Cl_{8}O	isobenzan	297-78-9
C_{9}H_{4}O_{5}	trimellitic anhydride	552-30-7
C_{9}H_{5}BrCrO_{3}	bromobenzenechromium tricarbonyl	12082-02-9
C_{9}H_{5}CrFO_{3}	fluorobenzenechromium tricarbonyl	12082-05-2
C_{9}H_{5}CrIO_{3}	iodobenzenechrornium tricarbonyl	12082-06-3
C_{9}H_{5}F_{13}O_{2}	ethyl perfluoroheptanoate	41430-70-0
C_{9}H_{5}O_{4}V	cyclopentadienylvanadiumtetracarbonyl	12108-04-2
C_{9}H_{6}Cl_{2}N_{2}O_{3}	methazole	20354-26-1
C_{9}H_{6}Cl_{5}NO_{2}	pentachlorophenyl dimethyl carbamate	90418-41-0
C_{9}H_{6}Cl_{6}O_{3}S	endosulfan 1	19595-59-6
C_{9}H_{6}Cl_{6}O_{3}S	endosulfan 2	19670-15-6
C_{9}H_{6}Cl_{6}O_{3}S	endosulfan	115-29-7
C_{9}H_{6}Cl_{6}O_{3}S	endosulfan i	959-98-8
C_{9}H_{6}Cl_{6}O_{3}S	endosulfan ii	33213-65-9
C_{9}H_{6}Cl_{6}O_{4}S	endosulfan sulfate	1031-07-8
C_{9}H_{6}Cl_{8}	chlorbicyclen	2550-75-6
C_{9}H_{6}CrO_{2}S	benzene chromium dicarbonyl thiocarbonyl	63356-86-5
C_{9}H_{6}FeO_{4}	cyclobutadienyl methyl ketone iron tricarbonyl	52445-09-7
C_{9}H_{6}O	Several compounds	–
C_{9}H_{6}O_{2}	coumarin	91-64-5
C_{9}H_{6}O_{2}	phenylpropiolic acid	637-44-5
C_{9}H_{6}O_{3}	homophthalic anhydride	703-59-3
C_{9}H_{6}O_{4}	ninhydrin	485-47-2
C_{9}H_{7}	indenyl radical	71551-80-9
C_{9}H_{7}ClO_{3}	acetylsalicyloyl chloride	5538-51-2
C_{9}H_{7}CrNO_{3}	aniline chromium tricarbonyl	12108-11-1
C_{9}H_{7}Cu	copper benzylacetylenide	66582-10-3
C_{9}H_{7}N	isoquinoline	119-65-3
C_{9}H_{7}N	quinoline	91-22-5
C_{9}H_{7}NOS	phenacyl thiocyanate	5399-30-4
C_{9}H_{7}N_{3}S	tricyclazole	41814-78-2
C_{9}H_{7}P	isophosphinoline	253-37-2
C_{9}H_{8}	indene	95-13-6
C_{9}H_{8}Cl_{3}NO_{2}S	captan	133-06-2
C_{9}H_{8}N_{2}O_{2}	pemoline	2152-34-3
C_{9}H_{8}O	cinnamylaldehyde	104-55-2
C_{9}H_{8}O_{2}	cinnamic acid	140-10-3
C_{9}H_{8}O_{2}S	phenyl propargyl sulfone	2525-40-8
C_{9}H_{8}O_{3}	Several molecules	–
C_{9}H_{8}O_{4}	monomethyl terephthalate	1679-64-7
C_{9}H_{8}S	phenyl propargyl sulfide	5651-88-7
C_{9}H_{9}Br	cinnamyl bromide	4392-24-9
C_{9}H_{9}ClO	benzenepropanoyl chloride	645-45-4
C_{9}H_{9}Cl_{2}NO_{2}	diloxanide	579-38-4
C_{9}H_{9}Cl_{2}N_{3}	clonidine	4205-90-7
C_{9}H_{9}F_{5}OSi	methanol dnpfps	23761-74-2
C_{9}H_{9}FeP	phosphaferrocene	63287-55-8
C_{9}H_{9}N	benzenepropanenitrile	645-59-0
C_{9}H_{9}NO	benzylidene acetamide	621-79-4
C_{9}H_{9}NO	cinnamaldehyde oxime	13372-81-1
C_{9}H_{9}NO_{3}	malonanilic acid	15580-32-2
C_{9}H_{9}NO_{3}	salacetamide	487-48-9
C_{9}H_{9}NO_{4}	benzadox	5251-93-4
C_{9}H_{9}N_{3}O_{2}S_{2}	sulfathiazole	72-14-0
C_{9}H_{10}	indane	496-11-7
C_{9}H_{10}NO_{3}PS	cyanophos	2636-26-2
C_{9}H_{10}N_{2}O_{2}	phenacemide	63-98-9
C_{9}H_{10}N_{2}O_{4}	dinitromesitylene	608-50-4
C_{9}H_{10}N_{2}S	etisazole	7716-60-1
C_{9}H_{10}O	benzyl methyl ketone	103-79-7
C_{9}H_{10}O	ethylbenzaldehyde	53951-50-1
C_{9}H_{10}O	hydratropaldehyde	34713-70-7
C_{9}H_{10}O	isochroman	493-05-0
C_{9}H_{10}O_{2}	benzyl ethanoate	140-11-4
C_{9}H_{10}O_{2}	phenyl ethyl formate	104-62-1
C_{9}H_{10}O_{3}	ethylparaben	120-47-8
C_{9}H_{10}O_{3}	methyl mandelate	4358-87-6
C_{9}H_{10}O_{3}	methyltetrahydrophthalic anhydride	26590-20-5
C_{9}H_{10}O_{3}	tropic acid	529-64-6
C_{9}H_{10}O_{3}S	phenyl sulfonyl acetone	5000-44-2
C_{9}H_{10}O_{4}	flopropione	2295-58-1
C_{9}H_{10}O_{5}	syringic acid	530-57-4
C_{9}H_{10}S	allylphenyl sulfide	5296-64-0
C_{9}H_{10}S	cyclopropyl phenyl sulfide	14633-54-6
C_{9}H_{10}S	isothiochroman	4426-75-9
C_{9}H_{10}S	thiochroman	2054-35-5
C_{9}H_{11}ClO_{3}	chlorphenesin	104-29-0
C_{9}H_{11}Cl_{2}FN_{2}O_{2}S_{2}	dichlofluanid	1085-98-9
C_{9}H_{11}Cl_{2}O_{3}PS	tolclofos methyl	57018-04-9
C_{9}H_{11}NO_{2}	ammonium cinnamate	25459-05-6
C_{9}H_{11}NO_{2}	ethenzamide	938-73-8
C_{9}H_{11}NO_{2}	isopropyl nicotinate	553-60-6
C_{9}H_{11}NO_{2}	metolcarb	1129-41-5
C_{9}H_{11}NO_{3}	styramate	94-35-9
C_{9}H_{11}NO_{3}	tyrosine	60-18-4
C_{9}H_{11}NO_{4}	levodopa	59-92-7
C_{9}H_{11}NS_{2}	pheny dithiocarbimidoic acid dimethyl ester	18805-23-7
C_{9}H_{12}	tetravinylmethane	20685-34-1
C_{9}H_{12}ClO_{2}PS_{3}	methyl carbophenothion	953-17-3
C_{9}H_{12}ClO_{4}P	heptenophos	23560-59-0
C_{9}H_{12}NO_{5}PS	fenitrothion	122-14-5
C_{9}H_{12}NO_{6}P	fenitrothion oxon	2255-17-6
C_{9}H_{12}N_{2}O_{6}	uridine	58-96-8
C_{9}H_{12}N_{4}O_{3}	tetramethyluric acid	2309-49-1
C_{9}H_{12}O	propoxybenzene	622-85-5
C_{9}H_{12}O_{2}	benzaldehyde dimethyl acetal	1125-88-8
C_{9}H_{12}O_{2}	trimethylhydroquinone	700-13-0
C_{9}H_{12}O_{3}	homovanillyl alcohol	2380-78-1
C_{9}H_{12}S	benzenepropanethiol	24734-68-7
C_{9}H_{12}Se	isopropyl selenobenzene	22233-89-2
C_{9}H_{13}BrN_{2}O_{2}	bromacil	314-40-9
C_{9}H_{13}ClN_{2}O_{2}	terbacil	5902-51-2
C_{9}H_{13}ClN_{6}	cyanazine	21725-46-2
C_{9}H_{13}N	amphetamine	300-62-9
C_{9}H_{13}N	benzenepropanamine	2038-57-5
C_{9}H_{13}N	dextroamphetamine	51-64-9
C_{9}H_{13}NO	phenylpropanolamine	492-41-1
C_{9}H_{13}NO_{2}	acetyldicyclopropyl ketoxime	94115-41-0
C_{9}H_{13}NO_{2}	cyclohexyl cyanoacetate	52688-11-6
C_{9}H_{13}NO_{2}	ethinamate	126-52-3
C_{9}H_{13}NO_{2}	pyrithyldione	77-04-3
C_{9}H_{13}NO_{2}	veratrylamine	5763-61-1
C_{9}H_{13}NO_{5}	diethyl isocyanato succinate	17046-24-1
C_{9}H_{13}N_{2}O_{2}	pyridostigmine	155-97-5
C_{9}H_{13}N_{3}O	iproniazid	54-92-2
C_{9}H_{13}N_{3}O_{2}	amisometradine	550-28-7
C_{9}H_{13}N_{3}O_{4}	deoxycytidine	951-77-9
C_{9}H_{13}N_{3}O_{5}	cytidine	65-46-3
C_{9}H_{14}	allylidenecyclohexane	5664-10-8
C_{9}H_{14}	apopinene	32863-61-9
C_{9}H_{14}	cyclononyne	6573-52-0
C_{9}H_{14}	santen	529-16-8
C_{9}H_{14}ClNO	phenylpropanolamine hydrochloride	53631-70-2
C_{9}H_{14}ClN_{5}	cyprazine	22936-86-3
C_{9}H_{14}Cl_{2}O_{2}	azelaoyl chloride	123-98-8
C_{9}H_{14}Ge	trimethylphenylgermanium	1626-00-2
C_{9}H_{14}N_{2}	azeleonitrile	1675-69-0
C_{9}H_{14}N_{2}O	phenoxypropazine	3818-37-9
C_{9}H_{14}N_{4}O_{3}	nimorazole	6506-37-2
C_{9}H_{14}O	cyclopentylethynylmethyl carbinol	100144-29-4
C_{9}H_{14}O	nopinone	24903-95-5
C_{9}H_{14}O	sabina ketone	513-20-2
C_{9}H_{14}O_{3}	methyldicyclopropylglycolate	100144-93-2
C_{9}H_{14}O_{4}	carbisopropoxy methyl methacrylate	23684-11-9
C_{9}H_{14}O_{4}	diethyl ethylidenemalonate	1462-12-0
C_{9}H_{14}O_{4}	diethyl glutaconate	2049-67-4
C_{9}H_{14}O_{4}	diethylitaconate	2409-52-1
C_{9}H_{14}Si	benzyldimethylsilane	1631-70-5
C_{9}H_{15}BrN_{2}O_{3}	acetylcarbromal	77-66-7
C_{9}H_{15}Cl_{3}O_{2}	heptyl trichloroacetate	65611-31-6
C_{9}H_{15}NO	diallylaminoacetone	73813-61-3
C_{9}H_{16}	allyl cyclohexane	2114-42-3
C_{9}H_{16}	cyclononene	3618-11-9
C_{9}H_{16}	ethylidenecycloheptane	10494-87-8
C_{9}H_{16}	methylenecyclooctane	3618-18-6
C_{9}H_{16}ClN_{5}	terbuthylazine	5915-41-3
C_{9}H_{16}Cl_{2}O_{2}	heptyl dichloroacetate	83004-97-1
C_{9}H_{16}N_{2}O_{2}	acetylimidazole diethyl acetal	111456-84-9
C_{9}H_{16}N_{2}O_{2}	apronal	528-92-7
C_{9}H_{16}N_{4}OS	tebuthiuron	34014-18-1
C_{9}H_{16}O	cyclononanone	3350-30-9
C_{9}H_{16}O	cyclooctanecarboxaldehyde	6688-11-5
C_{9}H_{16}O	nonenone	68678-89-7
C_{9}H_{16}O_{2}	butyl angelate	7785-64-0
C_{9}H_{16}O_{2}	cyclohexanepropanoic acid	701-97-3
C_{9}H_{16}O_{2}	cyclohexyl propionate	6222-35-1
C_{9}H_{16}O_{2}	ethyl cyclohexanecarboxylate	3289-28-9
C_{9}H_{16}O_{2}	isobutyl angelate	7779-81-9
C_{9}H_{16}O_{2}	methylcyclohexylacetate	14352-61-5
C_{9}H_{16}O_{2}	nonalactone	6008-27-1
C_{9}H_{16}O_{3}	acetoacetic acid isoamyl ester	2308-18-1
C_{9}H_{16}O_{4}	nonanedioic acid	123-99-9
C_{9}H_{17}BrO_{2}	heptyl bromoacetate	18991-99-6
C_{9}H_{17}ClO	nonanoyl chloride	764-85-2
C_{9}H_{17}ClO_{2}	heptyl chloroacetate	34589-22-5
C_{9}H_{17}N	nonanenitrile	2243-27-8
C_{9}H_{17}NO_{8}	neuraminic acid	114-04-5
C_{9}H_{17}NOS	molinate	2212-67-1
C_{9}H_{17}O_{2}Tl	thallium nonanoate	34244-92-3
C_{9}H_{18}	cyclononane	293-55-0
C_{9}H_{18}	ethylcycloheptane	13151-55-8
C_{9}H_{18}B_{2}O_{6}	trimethylene borate	20905-35-5
C_{9}H_{18}ClN	granatane hydrochoride	49656-52-2
C_{9}H_{18}N_{2}O_{2}S	thiofanox	39196-18-4
C_{9}H_{18}N_{6}	altretamine	645-05-6
C_{9}H_{18}O	cycloheptaneethanol	4480-98-2
C_{9}H_{18}O	cyclooctanemethanol	3637-63-6
C_{9}H_{18}O	nonanal	124-19-6
C_{9}H_{18}O_{2}	amyl butanoate	540-18-1
C_{9}H_{18}O_{2}	isobutyl pivalate	5129-38-4
C_{9}H_{18}O_{2}	nonanoic acid	112-05-0
C_{9}H_{18}O_{2}	propyl caproate	626-77-7
C_{9}H_{19}N	allyldipropylamine	5666-19-3
C_{9}H_{19}N	cycloheptaneethylamine	4448-84-4
C_{9}H_{19}N	isometheptene	503-01-5
C_{9}H_{19}NO	nonamide	1120-07-6
C_{9}H_{19}NO_{4}	dexpanthenol	81-13-0
C_{9}H_{19}NOS	EPTC (S-Ethyl dipropylthiocarbamate)	759-94-4
C_{9}H_{20}	nonane	111-84-2
C_{9}H_{20}FO_{2}P	heptyl ethylphosphonofluoridate	162085-85-0
C_{9}H_{20}N_{2}S_{2}	diethylammonium diethyldithiocarbamate	1518-58-7
C_{9}H_{20}O	isononanol	27458-94-2
C_{9}H_{20}O	nonanol	28473-21-4
C_{9}H_{20}O_{2}	diisobutoxymethane	2568-91-4
C_{9}H_{20}O_{4}	tripropylene glycol	1638-16-0
C_{9}H_{20}O_{4}	tetraethoxymethane	78-09-1
C_{9}H_{20}O_{5}	tetraethyleneglycol monomethylether	23783-42-8
C_{9}H_{21}Al	tripropylaluminium	102-67-0
C_{9}H_{21}AlO_{3}	aluminium isopropoxide	555-31-7
C_{9}H_{21}BO_{2}	nonyl boric acid	3088-78-6
C_{9}H_{21}ClSi	triisopropylsilyl chloride	13154-24-0
C_{9}H_{21}N	diethylpentylamine	2162-91-6
C_{9}H_{21}O_{3}P	tripropyl phosphite	923-99-9
C_{9}H_{21}O_{4}P	tripropyl phosphate	513-08-6
C_{9}H_{21}PS_{3}	propyl phosphorotrithioite	869-56-7
C_{9}H_{22}OSi	propyloxytriethylsilane	17841-44-0
C_{9}H_{22}O_{4}P_{2}S_{4}	ethion	563-12-2
C_{9}H_{22}Si	triisopropylsilane	6485-79-6
C_{9}H_{22}Si	tripropylsilane	998-29-8
C_{9}H_{23}N_{3}	PMDTA	3030-47-5

== See also ==
- Carbon number
- List of compounds with carbon number 8
- List of compounds with carbon number 10
