= C9H20O =

The molecular formula C_{9}H_{20}O (molar mass: 144.25 g/mol, exact mass: 144.1514 u) may refer to:

- 3,5,5-Trimethyl-hexan-1-ol
- 3-Methyl-3-octanol, or 3-methyloctan-3-ol
- 1-Nonanol
- 2-Nonanol
- Isononyl alcohol
- 2,6-Dimethyl-2-heptanol
