= C9H16O2 =

The molecular formula C_{9}H_{16}O_{2} may refer to:

- Allyl hexanoate
- 4-Hydroxynonenal
- Nonalactones
  - cis-3-Methyl-4-octanolide
  - trans-3-Methyl-4-octanolide
  - δ-Nonalactone
  - γ-Nonalactone
