= Nonanol =

Nonanol is a type of simple alcohol. Its isomers include:

- 1-Nonanol
- 2-Nonanol
- 2,6-Dimethyl-2-heptanol, used as a fragrance
- Isononyl alcohol
- 3-Methyl-3-octanol
- 3,5,5-Trimethyl-hexan-1-ol
