= C2H3NS =

The molecular formula C_{2}H_{3}NS (molar mass: 73.12 g/mol, exact mass: 72.9986 u) may refer to:

- Methyl isothiocyanate, organosulfur compound with the formula CH_{3}N=C=S
- Methyl thiocyanate, organic compound with the formula CH_{3}SCN
