= Alertness =

State of active attention by high sensory awareness such as being watchful

Alertness is a state of active attention characterized by high sensory awareness. Someone who is alert is vigilant and promptly meets danger or emergency, or is quick to perceive and act. Alertness is a psychological and physiological state.

Lack of alertness is a symptom of a number of conditions, including narcolepsy, attention deficit hyperactivity disorder, chronic fatigue syndrome, depression, Addison's disease, and sleep deprivation. Pronounced lack of alertness is an altered level of consciousness. States with low levels of alertness include drowsiness.

The word is formed from "alert", which comes from the Italian all'erta (on the watch, literally: on the height; 1618).

Wakefulness refers mainly to differences between the sleep and waking states; vigilance refers to sustained alertness and concentration. Both terms are sometimes used synonymously with alertness.

== Importance and difficulty ==
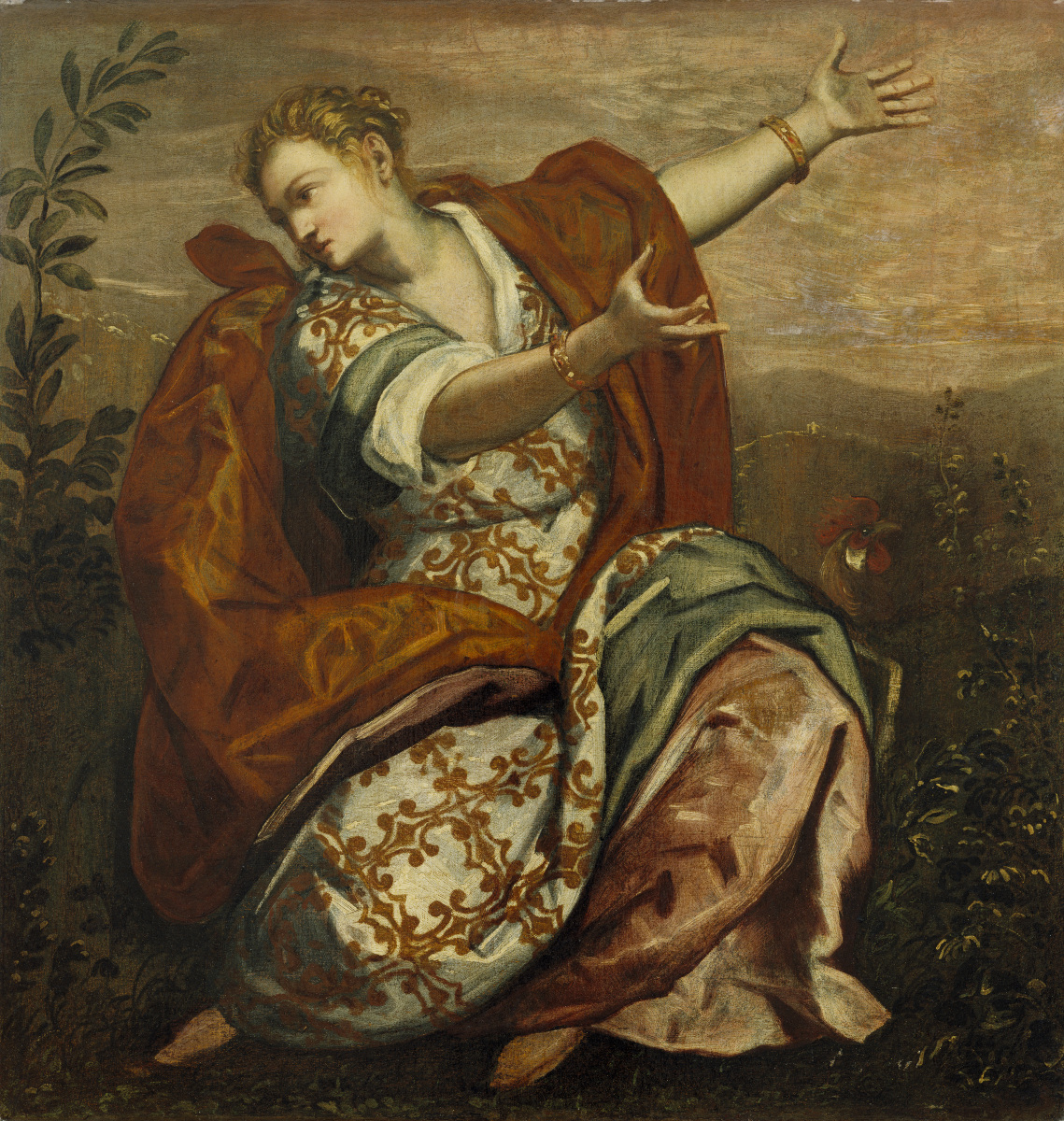
Domenico Tintoretto, Allegory of Vigilance

People who have to be alert during their jobs, such as air traffic controllers or pilots, often face challenges maintaining their alertness. Research shows that for people "...engaged in attention-intensive and monotonous tasks, retaining a constant level of alertness is rare if not impossible." If people employed in safety-related or transportation jobs have lapses in alertness, this "may lead to severe consequences in occupations ranging from air traffic control to monitoring of nuclear power plants."

== Neurobiological pathways ==
Neurotransmitters that can initiate, promote, or enhance wakefulness or alertness include serotonin, (nor)epinephrine, dopamine (e.g. blockade of dopamine reuptake), glutamate, histamine, and acetylcholine. Neuromodulators that can do so include the neuropeptide orexin. Similarly inhibition or reduction of mechanisms causing sleepiness, or drowsiness such as certain cytokines and adenosine (as with caffeine) may also increase perceived wakefulness and thus alertness.

Wakefulness depends on the coordinated effort of multiple brain areas. These are affected by neurotransmitters and other factors. Many Neurotransmitters are in effect to experience wakefulness to include GABA, Acetylcholine, Adenosine, Serotonin, Norepinephrine, Histamine, and Dopamine. There is not an isolated neurotransmitter that alone is responsible for the sensation of wakefulness. However, it is known that many transmitters are used together to cause this effect. Research to map the wakefulness circuitry is ongoing.

Beta power has been used as an indicator of cortical arousal or alertness by several studies. A study also measured alertness with EEG data.

Additional information can be found on the neurobiology, neuroscience, brain, behavioral neuroscience, and neurotransmitter pages.

== Drugs used to increase alertness ==
The stimulant and adenosine receptor antagonist caffeine is widely used to increase alertness or wakefulness and improve mood or performance. People typically self-administer it in the form of drinks like green tea (where it is present alongside the l-theanine), energy drinks (often containing sugar/sugar-substitutes), or coffee (which contains various polyphenols). The chemicals that accompany caffeine in these preparations can potentially alter the alertness-promoting effects of caffeine. Caffeine is the world's most consumed stimulant drug.

Various natural biochemicals and herbs may have similar anti-fatigue effects, such as rhodiola rosea. Various psychostimulants like bromantane have also been investigated as potential treatments for conditions where fatigue is a primary symptom. The alkaloids theacrine and methylliberine are structurally similar to caffeine and preliminary research supports their pro-alertness effects.

During the Second World War, U.S. soldiers and aviators were given benzedrine, an amphetamine drug, to increase their alertness during long periods on duty. While air force pilots are able to use the drug to remain awake during combat flights, the use of amphetamines by commercial airline pilots is forbidden. British troops used 72 million amphetamine tablets in the second world war and the Royal Air Force used so many that "Methedrine won the Battle of Britain" according to one report. American bomber pilots used amphetamines ("go pills") to stay awake during long missions. The Tarnak Farm incident, in which an American F-16 pilot killed several friendly Canadian soldiers on the ground, was blamed by the pilot on his use of amphetamine. A nonjudicial hearing rejected the pilot's claim.

Amphetamine is a common study aid among college and high-school students. Amphetamine increases energy levels, concentration, and motivation, allowing students to study for an extended period of time. These drugs are often acquired through diverted prescriptions of medication used to treat ADHD, acquired from fellow students, rather than illicitly produced drugs. Cocaine is also used to increase alertness, and cocaine-related alkaloids present in coca tea.

The eugeroic modafinil has recently gained popularity with the US Military and other militaries.

== Other approaches for increasing alertness ==
Beyond good sleep, physical activity, and healthy diet, a review suggests odours, music, and extrinsic motivation may increase alertness or decrease mental fatigue. Short rest periods and adjustments to lighting (level and type of) may also be useful. Various types of neurostimulation are being researched, as is the microbiome and related interventions.

== Alertness after waking ==
A study suggests non-genetic determinants of alertness upon waking up from sleep are:

- sleep quantity/quality the night before
- physical activity the day prior
- a carbohydrate-rich breakfast
- a lower blood glucose response following breakfast
  - (modifiable as well, for example via choice of food and with berberine)

The baseline level of daily alertness is related to the quality of sleep (in the 2022 study measured only by self-reported quality), positive emotional state (specifically self-report happiness), and age. There are genes that enable people to be apparently healthy and alert with little sleep. However, twin-pair analyses indicate that the genetic contribution to daytime alertness is small. Other factors such as natural light exposure and synchronicity with the circadian rhythm may matter as well.

== Behavioral ecology ==
Vigilance is important for animals so that they may watch out for predators. Typically a reduction in alertness is observed in animals that live in larger groups. Studies on vigilance have been conducted on various animals including the scaly-breasted munia.

== See also ==
- Awareness – State of knowing or noticing something
- Consciousness – Awareness of internal and external existence
- Disorders of consciousness
- Wakefulness – Brain state and state of consciousness
