= 3-Methyl-4-octanolide =

3-Methyl-4-octanolide, cis and trans isomers.

3-Methyl-4-octanolide, also called β-methyl-γ-octalactone or 5-butyldihydro-4-methylfuran-2-one can be either of two chemical products of the lactone family:

- cis-3-Methyl-4-octanolide, or "whisky lactone", the component of oak wood that imparts flavor to whisky
- trans-3-Methyl-4-octanolide, also found in oak wood.
