= C9H12N4O3 =

The molecular formula C_{9}H_{12}N_{4}O_{3} may refer to:

- Methylliberine, an isolate of coffee beans, tea, cola nuts, guarana, cocoa, and yerba mate
- Theacrine, a purine alkaloid found in Cupuaçu and a Chinese tea known as kucha
