= Trimethyluric acid =

Trimethyluric acid may refer to:

- O(2),1,9-Trimethyluric acid, also known as Liberine
- 1,3,7-Trimethyluric acid
