= C8H10N4O3 =

The molecular formula C_{8}H_{10}N_{4}O_{3} may refer to:

- Liberine
- 1,3,7-Trimethyluric acid, also known as trimethyluric acid and 8-oxy-caffeine
