= C9H11NO2 =

The molecular formula C_{9}H_{11}NO_{2} (molar mass: 165.18 g/mol, exact mass: 165.078979) may refer to:

- Ammonium cinnamate
- Benzocaine
- Ethenzamide
- Methylenedioxyphenethylamine
- Metolcarb
- Norsalsolinol
- 3,4-Methylenedioxy-N-methylbenzylamine, closely related to isosafrole.
- Parapropamol
- Phenylalanine
  - D-Phenylalanine
