= Γ-Lactone =

γ-Lactones are a family of organic compounds with the formula cyclo-O=COCHRCH_{2}CH_{2}. The parent member is γ-butyrolactone (R = H). A commercially important set of γ-lactones are derived from the free radical addition of fatty alcohols and acrylic acid. They are all weakly volatile liquids, which are colorless when pure, but typical samples are not.

Some γ-lactone fragrances
Name	Formula	Registry number	Notes
γ-Octalactone	C_{8}H_{14}O_{2}	104-50-7	fruity
γ-Nonalactone	C_{9}H_{16}O_{2}	104-61-0	coconut-like
γ-Decalactone	C_{10}H_{18}O_{2}	706-14-9	peach flavors
γ-Undecalactone	C_{11}H_{20}O_{2}	104-67-6	peach flavors
β-Methyl-γ-octalactone	C_{9}H_{16}O_{2}	39212-23-2	whisky lactone

== Production ==
Chemical, biological, and hybrid routes have been developed for these fragrances. Some fungal enzymes hydroxylate fatty acids, leading to the corresponding lactones. In terms of chemical routes, fatty alcohols undergo free radical addition to acrylic acid, giving hydroxy carboxylic acids, which spontaneously lactonize.

chemical route to gamma-lactones from fatty alcohols
