= Tetramethyluric acid =

Tetramethyluric acid may refer to:

- Methylliberine (O^{2},1,7,9-tetramethyluric acid)
- Theacrine (1,3,7,9-tetramethyluric acid)
