= OR1G1 =

Protein-coding gene in the species Homo sapiens

Identifiers
- Aliases: OR1G1, OR17-130, OR17-209, OR1G2, olfactory receptor family 1 subfamily G member 1
- External IDs: GeneCards: OR1G1

Gene location (Human)
Chr.	Chromosome 17 (human)
Band	17p13.3	Start	3,126,610 bp
Band	17p13.3	End	3,127,551 bp
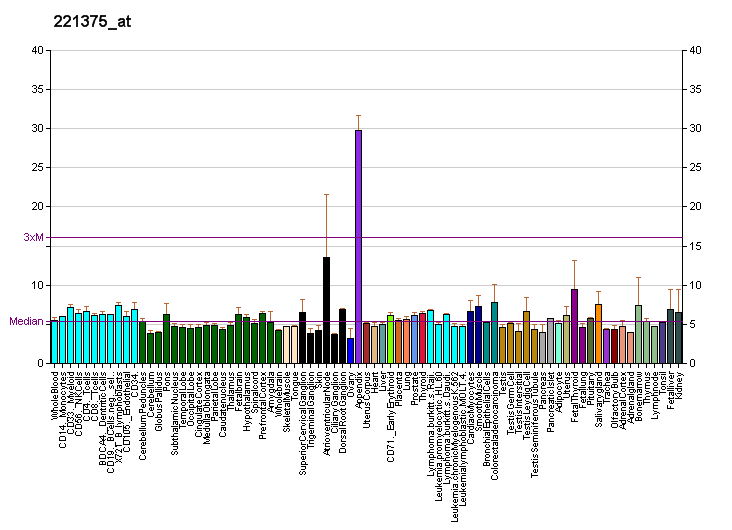
RNA expression pattern
Bgee	Human / Mouse (ortholog); Top expressed in: gonad; ventricular zone / n/a; More reference expression data
BioGPS	More reference expression data
Gene ontology
Molecular function	transmembrane signaling receptor activity; G protein-coupled receptor activity; olfactory receptor activity; signal transducer activity
Cellular component	integral component of membrane; plasma membrane; membrane
Biological process	detection of chemical stimulus involved in sensory perception; detection of chemical stimulus involved in sensory perception of smell; sensory perception of smell; signal transduction; response to stimulus; G protein-coupled receptor signaling pathway
Sources:Amigo / QuickGO
Orthologs
Databases	NCBI: entry; OMA: entry
Species	Human	Mouse
Entrez	8390	n/a
Ensembl	ENSG00000183024	n/a
UniProt	P47890	n/a
RefSeq (mRNA)	NM_003555	n/a
RefSeq (protein)	NP_003546	n/a
Location (UCSC)	Chr 17: 3.13 – 3.13 Mb	n/a
PubMed search		n/a
- Wikidata
View/Edit Human

Olfactory receptor 1G1 is a protein that in humans is encoded by the OR1G1 gene.

== Function ==
Olfactory receptors interact with odorant molecules in the nose, to initiate a neuronal response that triggers the perception of a smell. The olfactory receptor proteins are members of a large family of G-protein-coupled receptors (GPCR) arising from single coding-exon genes. Olfactory receptors share a 7-transmembrane domain structure with many neurotransmitter and hormone receptors and are responsible for the recognition and G protein-mediated transduction of odorant signals. The olfactory receptor gene family is the largest in the genome. The nomenclature assigned to the olfactory receptor genes and proteins for this organism is independent of other organisms.

== Ligands ==
The OR1G1 receptor is associated with sensory sensations including "waxy", "fatty", and "rose", and also "fruity" and "sweet".

Compared to other olfactory receptors such as OR52D1, OR1G1 is broadly tuned to respond to odorants in different chemical classes, but it is sensitive to chain length, responding most strongly to chains of 9-10 carbons.

Examples of agonists include:

- nonanal (strong)
- 1-nonanol (strong)
- 2-ethyl-1-hexanol (strong)
- γ-decalactone (strong)
- ethyl isobutyrate (strong)
- 1-octanol
- celery ketone
- citral
- isoamyl acetate

Example antagonists include:

- hexanal
- 1-hexanol
- cyclohexanone

The pattern of 6-carbon antagonists compared to ~9-carbon agonists is likely explained by OR1G1 having a deep pocket at its binding site, such that the 6-carbon molecules block the opening, but do not reach the bottom of the deep pocket as required to activate the signal transduction chain.

== See also ==
- Olfactory receptor
