= C9H6O =

The molecular formula C_{9}H_{6}O may refer to:

- Indenone
- Isoindenone
- Ethynylbenzaldehyde
- 2,3-Di(1-propynyl)-2-cyclopropen-1-one
- Phenylpropynal
