= C9H8 =

The molecular formula C_{9}H_{8} (molar mass: 126.24 g/mol, exact mass: 126.1409 u) may refer to:

- Indene
- Isoindene
