= C8H15NOS2 =

The molecular formula C_{8}H_{15}NOS_{2} (molar mass: 205.341 g/mol, exact mass: 205.0595 u) may refer to:

- Lipoamide
- 6-(Methylsulfinyl)hexyl isothiocyanate
