= Butylate =

Butylate can refer to:

- Butylate (herbicide)
- Butyrate esters and salts
- Butyl group as a substituent:
  - Butylated hydroxyanisole
  - Butylated hydroxytoluene
