= Butylate (herbicide) =

Weed control herbicide

Names
- Preferred IUPAC name S-Ethyl N,N-bis(2-methylpropyl)carbamothioate
- Other names: Butilate; Sutan; S-Ethyl diisobutylthiocarbamate; S-Ethyl N,N-diisobutylthiocarbamate

Identifiers
CAS Number	2008-41-5
3D model (JSmol)	Interactive image
ChEBI	CHEBI:34594
ChEMBL	ChEMBL1873329
ChemSpider	15357
ECHA InfoCard	100.016.289
EC Number	217-916-3
PubChem CID	16181
UNII	3U78PG73G7
CompTox Dashboard (EPA)	DTXSID7023936
- InChI: InChI=1S/C11H23NOS/c1-6-14-11(13)12(7-9(2)3)8-10(4)5/h9-10H,6-8H2,1-5H3 Key: BMTAFVWTTFSTOG-UHFFFAOYSA-N
- SMILES: CCSC(=O)N(CC(C)C)CC(C)C

Properties
Chemical formula	C_{11}H_{23}NOS
Molar mass	217.37 g·mol^{−1}
Appearance	Amber liquid
Odor	Aromatic odor
Density	940 kg/m^{3}
Melting point	137.7 °C (279.9 °F; 410.8 K)
Boiling point	292.6 °C (558.7 °F; 565.8 K)
Solubility in water	45 mg/L
Vapor pressure	170 mPa

Hazards
- GHS labelling
Hazard statements	H312, H332
Flash point	115 °C (239 °F; 388 K)
- Lethal dose or concentration (LD, LC)
LD_{50} (median dose)	3500 mg/kg (rat, oral); >4640 mg/kg (birds)
LC_{50} (median concentration)	>4.2 mg/L (freshwater fish, 96 hours)
- Except where otherwise noted, data are given for materials in their standard state (at 25 °C [77 °F], 100 kPa). Infobox references

Butylate or butilate is a widely used thiocarbamate herbicide. As a herbicide, it was introduced in 1962, and it quickly became the fourth most used herbicide in the US, with 28.5 million pounds (12.9 thousand tonnes) used in 1974. Its use has declined significantly, to 15 million pounds (6.8 thousand tonnes) in 1991 to 950 thousand pounds (430 tonnes) by 1998. It is used on corn (field, sweet, and popcorn), to control grassy and broadleaf weeds and nutsedge.

== Application ==
Butylate is applied as an emulsifiable concentrate of 85% active ingredient and is incorporated into the soil, being applied preplant, at plant, postplant, or after harvest. Its maxmimum application rate is 6.3 lb/acre (7.1 kg/Ha), which is much higher than many other herbicides. Soil incorporation is necessary due to the high volatility. Granular and encapsulated forms are also used. Butylate is often used in combination with atrazine and cyanazine.

There is no residential application of butylate; its use is only on feed-crop.

Butylate can interact with other thiocarbamate herbicides in plants, such as with carbofuran, which reduces synergistically the root and shoot growth of barley, as carbofuran slows the plant's metabolism of butylate, thus letting it accumulate. The effect is not seen on corn, where both carbamates compete for the same mode of uptake.

== Health ==
Butylate is not toxic, not carcinogenic, not teratogenic and not mutagenic. Rat trials show acute neurotoxic effects at the lowest observed adverse effects level (LOAEL) of 2,000 mg/kg/day, leading to a no observed adverse effects level (NOAEL) of 600 milligrams/kilogram/day being established for the general population. At 400 mg/kg/day, rat offspring development was affected, showing decreased fetal weights and increased incidences of misaligned sterebrae, although no developmental effect at any dose is noted in rabbits.

The EPA estimates human food exposure was under 0.3% of the permissible dose for all population subgroups, and so dietary risk of butylate is not a concern. Butylate is metabolised rapidly, so there are no residues expected in meat, milk, poultry or eggs, and no intact residues are found in harvested corn.

The EPA requires that pesticide applicators wear, among other items, pants.

== Environmental ==
Butylate has high volatility, with a vapor pressure of 170 mPa, so it may drift outside of target areas. Butylate is mobile to slightly mobile in soil. Ground water contamination is not expected. Technical butylate is highly toxic to freshwater fish, and non-toxic to birds and mammals. Surface water runoff may occur after rain.

== Links ==
- Butylate (herbicide) in the Pesticide Properties DataBase (PPDB)
