= Nonalactone =

Nonalactone may refer to:

- δ-Nonalactone
- γ-Nonalactone
