= Organic thiocyanates =

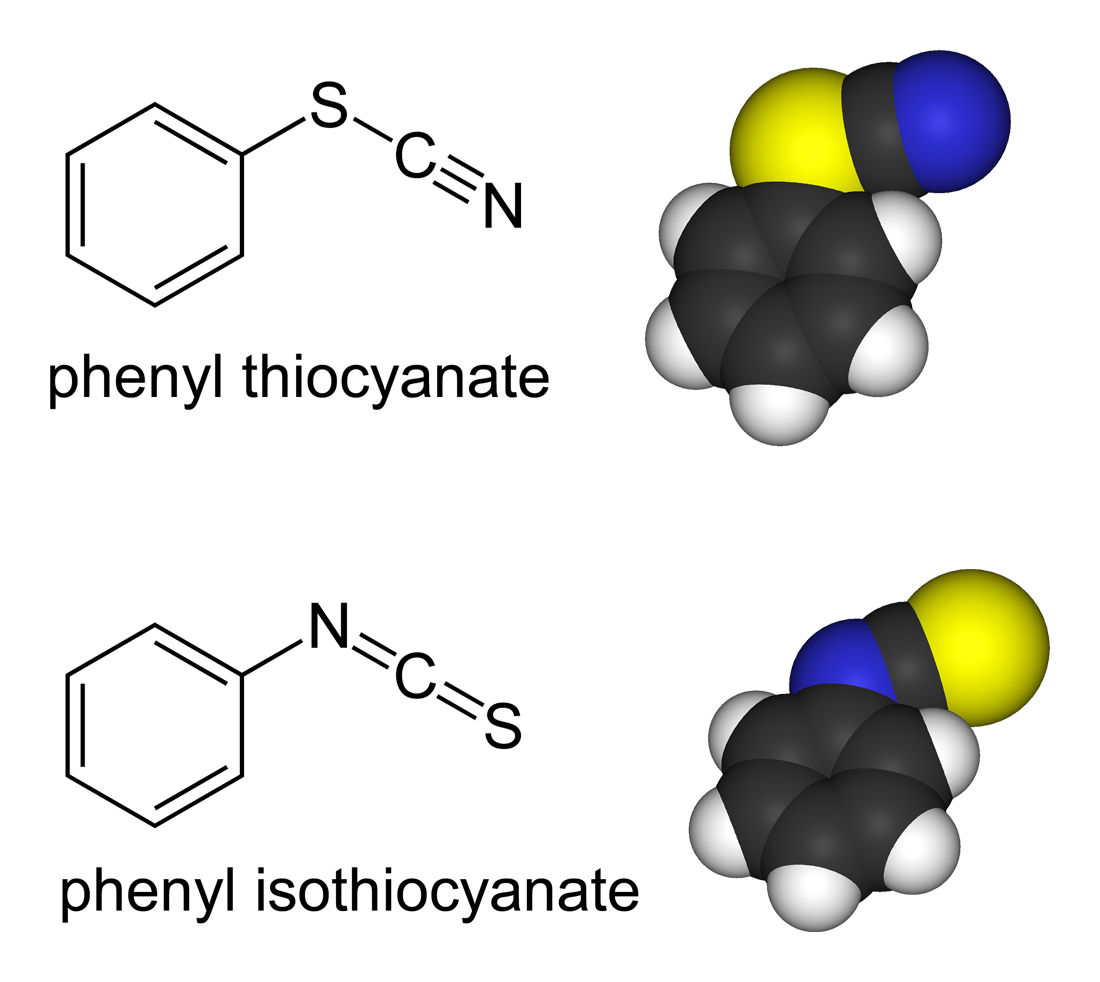
Phenyl thiocyanate and phenyl isothiocyanate are isomers.

Organic thiocyanates are organic compounds containing the functional group RSCN. the organic group is attached to sulfur: R−S−C≡N has a S–C single bond and a C≡N triple bond.

Organic thiocyanates are valued building blocks. They allow to access efficiently various sulfur containing functional groups and scaffolds.

== Synthesis ==
Several routes synthesize thiocyanates, the most common being the reaction between alkyl halides and alkali thiocyanate in aqueous media. Illustrative is the preparation of isopropyl thiocyanate by treatment of isopropyl bromide with sodium thiocyanate in boiling ethanol. The main complication with this route is the competing formation of alkyisothiocyanates. "SN1-type" substrates (e.g., benzyl halides) tend to give the isothiocyanate derivatives.

Some organic thiocyanates are generated by cyanation of some organosulfur compounds. Organyl thiosulfates (RSSO_{3}^{−}) react with alkali metal cyanides to give thiocyanates with displacement of sulfite. This approach has been applied to allyl thiocyanate:

CH_{2}=CHCH_{2}Cl + Na_{2}S_{2}O_{3} → CH_{2}=CHCH_{2}S_{2}O_{3}Na + NaCl
CH_{2}=CHCH_{2}S_{2}O_{3}Na + NaCN → CH_{2}=CHCH_{2}SCN + Na_{2}SO_{3}

Sulfenyl chlorides (RSCl) also convert to thiocyanates.

Aryl thiocyanates are traditionally produced by the Sandmeyer reaction, which involves combining copper(I) thiocyanate and diazonium salts:

[ArN_{2}]BF_{4} + CuSCN → ArSCN + CuBF_{4} + N_{2}

Some arylthiocyanates can also often be obtained by thiocyanogenation, i.e. the reaction of thiocyanogen. This reaction is favored for electron-rich aromatic substrates.

== Structure ==
In methyl thiocyanate, N≡C and C−S distances are 116 and 176 pm. By contrast, N=C and C=S distances are 117 and 158 pm in isothiocyanates.

Typical bond angles for C−S−C are 100°. By contrast C−N=C in aryl isothiocyanates is 165°. Again, the thiocyanate isomers are quite different with C−S−C angle near 100°.

In both organic thiocyanate and isothiocyanate isomers the SCN angle approaches 180°.

== Reactions ==
Organic thiocyanates are hydrolyzed to thiocarbamates in the Riemschneider thiocarbamate synthesis.

Electrochemical reduction typically converts thiocyanates to mercaptides and cyanide, although sometimes it can replace the thiocyanate group as a whole with hydride.

Some thiocyanates isomerize to the isothiocyanates. This reaction is especially rapid for the allyl isothiocyanate:

CH_{2}=CHCH_{2}SCN → CH_{2}=CHCH_{2}NCS

Likewise, acyl thiocyanates are difficult to synthesize because any excess thiocyanate ion catalyzes isomerization to the acyl isothiocyanate.

== See also ==
- Isothiocyanate, isomers of organic thiocyanates with the formula R−N=C=S
- Methyl thiocyanate, the simplest organic thiocyanate
