= OR52D1 =

Protein-coding gene in the species Homo sapiens

Identifiers
- Aliases: OR52D1, OR11-43, olfactory receptor family 52 subfamily D member 1, olfactory receptor family 52 subfamily D member 1 (gene/pseudogene)
- External IDs: MGI: 3030480; GeneCards: OR52D1

Gene location (Human)
Chr.	Chromosome 11 (human)
Band	11p15.4	Start	5,488,685 bp
Band	11p15.4	End	5,489,749 bp

Gene location (Mouse)
Chr.	Chromosome 7 (mouse)
Band	7|7 E3	Start	103,754,080 bp
Band	7|7 E3	End	103,758,973 bp
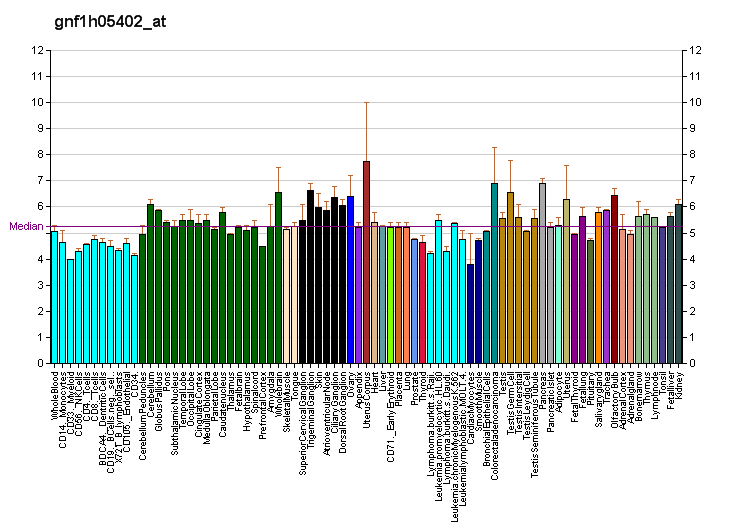
RNA expression pattern
Bgee	Human / Mouse (ortholog); Top expressed in: sural nerve; Achilles tendon; left testis; skin of thigh; right testis / n/a; More reference expression data
BioGPS	More reference expression data
Gene ontology
Molecular function	G protein-coupled receptor activity; olfactory receptor activity; signal transducer activity
Cellular component	integral component of membrane; plasma membrane; membrane
Biological process	sensory perception of smell; signal transduction; response to stimulus; detection of chemical stimulus involved in sensory perception of smell; G protein-coupled receptor signaling pathway
Sources:Amigo / QuickGO
Orthologs
Databases	NCBI: entry; OMA: entry
Species	Human	Mouse
Entrez	390066	259058
Ensembl	ENSG00000181609	ENSMUSG00000073931
UniProt	Q9H346	Q8VGW2
RefSeq (mRNA)	NM_001005163	NM_147056
RefSeq (protein)	NP_001005163	NP_667267
Location (UCSC)	Chr 11: 5.49 – 5.49 Mb	Chr 7: 103.75 – 103.76 Mb
PubMed search
- Wikidata
View/Edit Human	View/Edit Mouse

Olfactory receptor 52D1 is a protein that in humans is encoded by the OR52D1 gene.

Olfactory receptors interact with odorant molecules in the nose, to initiate a neuronal response that triggers the perception of a smell. The olfactory receptor proteins are members of a large family of G-protein-coupled receptors (GPCR) arising from single coding-exon genes. Olfactory receptors share a 7-transmembrane domain structure with many neurotransmitter and hormone receptors and are responsible for the recognition and G protein-mediated transduction of odorant signals. The olfactory receptor gene family is the largest in the genome. The nomenclature assigned to the olfactory receptor genes and proteins for this organism is independent of other organisms.

== Ligands ==
Compared to other olfactory receptors such as OR1G1, OR52D1 has a more narrow/specific range of ligands.

Agonists:

- Methyl octanoate
- "Better activated by acids, aldehydes, ketones and esters than alcohols or pyrazines"

== See also ==
- Olfactory receptor
