= Benzadox-ammonium =

Herbicide variant of benzadox

Names
- Preferred IUPAC name ammonium (benzamidooxy)acetate
- Other names: ammonium benzadox; Topcide or Topicide; ammonium benzamidooxyacetate; ammonium 2-[(benzoylamino)oxy]acetate

Identifiers
CAS Number	5251-79-6
3D model (JSmol)	Interactive image
ChemSpider	20039
PubChem CID	21321
UNII	5U94VWZ93E
CompTox Dashboard (EPA)	DTXSID1058397
- InChI: InChI=1S/C9H9NO4.H3N/c11-8(12)6-14-10-9(13)7-4-2-1-3-5-7;/h1-5H,6H2,(H,10,13)(H,11,12);1H3 Key: ARRGVXFLPAQYKA-UHFFFAOYSA-N
- SMILES: C1=CC=C(C=C1)C(=O)NOCC(=O)[O-].[NH4+]

Properties
Chemical formula	C_{9}H_{12}N_{2}O_{4}
Molar mass	212.205 g·mol^{−1}
Boiling point	404 °C (759 °F; 677 K)
Solubility in water	25 g/L

Hazards
Flash point	198.2°C (389°F)
- Lethal dose or concentration (LD, LC)
LD_{50} (median dose)	>2500 mg/kg (rat)

Related compounds
Related compounds	Benzadox
- Except where otherwise noted, data are given for materials in their standard state (at 25 °C [77 °F], 100 kPa). Infobox references

Benzadox-ammonium is a chemical variant of the herbicide benzadox, usually formulated into emulsifiable concentrate (EC) or wettable powders (WP). See benzadox for the main article. "Bendazox" may refer to bendazox itself or benzadox-ammonium, the ammonium salt.

Benzadox-ammonium is produced from benzadox by neutralising it with ammonium hydroxide or similar, and then filtered, dried and milled to appropriate purity. The bare form, benzadox, is also the major metabolite product of benzadox ammonium degradation in soil.
