= Isoindene =

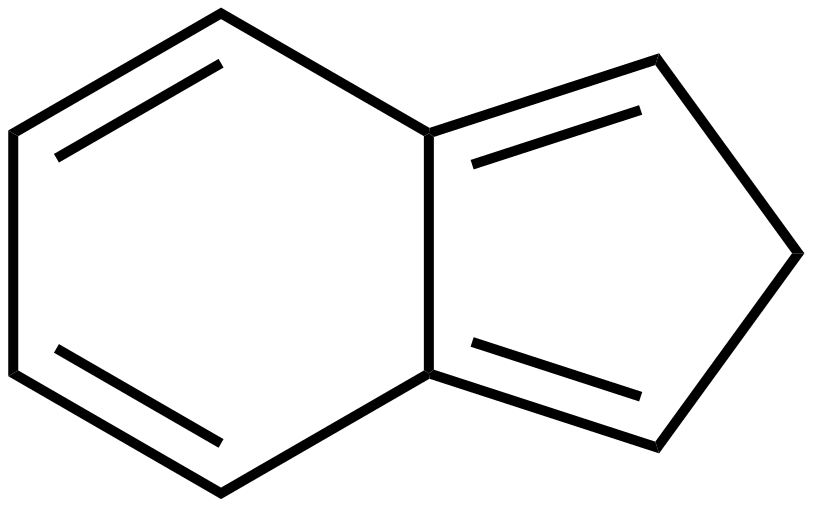
- Skeletal formula

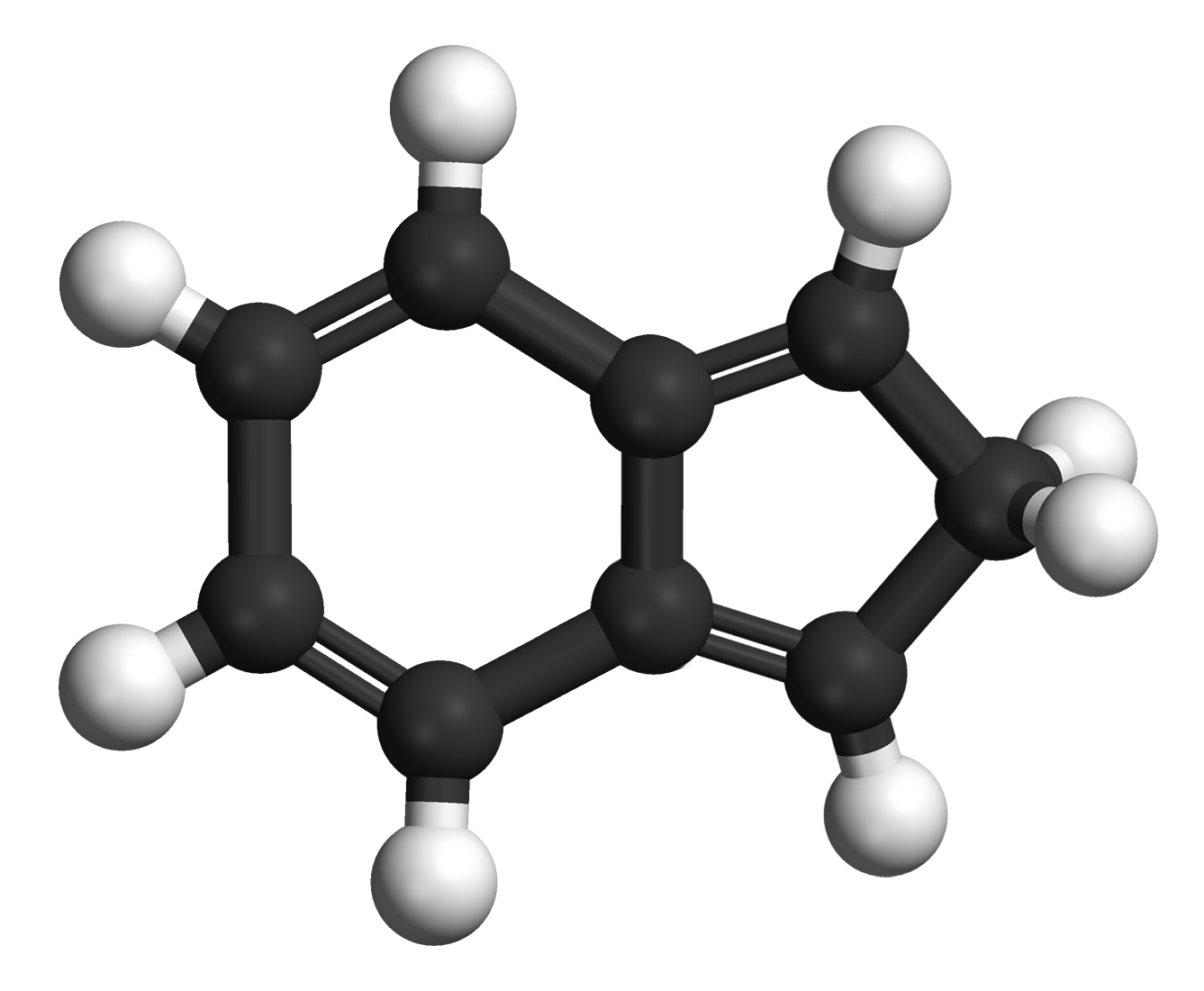
- Ball-and-stick model

Names
- Preferred IUPAC name 2H-Indene
- Other names 2H-Isoindene

Identifiers
CAS Number	270-53-1
3D model (JSmol)	Interactive image
ChEBI	CHEBI:33054
ChemSpider	392097
PubChem CID	444084
UNII	QF4FM9ZP7E
CompTox Dashboard (EPA)	DTXSID10332142
- InChI: InChI=1S/C9H8/c1-2-5-9-7-3-6-8(9)4-1/h1-2,4-7H,3H2 Key: BQTJMKIHKULPCZ-UHFFFAOYSA-N; InChI=1/C9H8/c1-2-5-9-7-3-6-8(9)4-1/h1-2,4-7H,3H2 Key: BQTJMKIHKULPCZ-UHFFFAOYAS
- SMILES: C12=CCC=C1C=CC=C2

Properties
Chemical formula	C_{9}H_{8}
Molar mass	116.163 g·mol^{−1}
- Except where otherwise noted, data are given for materials in their standard state (at 25 °C [77 °F], 100 kPa). verify (what is ?) Infobox references

Isoindene is a flammable polycyclic hydrocarbon with chemical formula C_{9}H_{8}. It is composed of a cyclohexadiene ring fused with a cyclopentadiene ring.

== See also ==
- Indene
- Isoindole
- Isoindenone
