= Benzadox =

Weed control herbicide

Names
- Preferred IUPAC name (benzamidooxy)acetic acid
- Other names: Topcide (brand name); S6175; 2-[(benzoylamino)oxy]acetic acid; benzamidooxyacetic acid; benzamido-oxyacetic acid; o-Benzamidoglycolic acid; ((Benzoylamino)oxy)acetic acid; S-7173 or S-7,173; Topicide (brand name); NSC 75601; N-benzoyl-O-(carboxymethyl)-hydroxylamine

Identifiers
CAS Number	5251-93-4
3D model (JSmol)	Interactive image
ChEMBL	ChEMBL449455
ChemSpider	20040
ECHA InfoCard	100.023.685
EC Number	226-053-1
PubChem CID	21322
UNII	KSR5R1E31I
CompTox Dashboard (EPA)	DTXSID7041625
- InChI: InChI=1S/C9H9NO4/c11-8(12)6-14-10-9(13)7-4-2-1-3-5-7/h1-5H,6H2,(H,10,13)(H,11,12) Key: WDRGQGLIUAMOOC-UHFFFAOYSA-N
- SMILES: C1=CC=C(C=C1)C(=O)NOCC(=O)O

Properties
Chemical formula	C_{9}H_{9}NO_{4}
Molar mass	195.174 g·mol^{−1}
Appearance	Off-white solid
Odor	Odourless
Melting point	140 °C (284 °F; 413 K)

Hazards
- GHS labelling
Pictograms	(GHS07: Exclamation mark)
Hazard statements	H302
Precautionary statements	P264, P270, P301+P317, P330, P501
- Lethal dose or concentration (LD, LC)
LD_{50} (median dose)	>2500 mg/kg (rat, benzadox-ammonium)

Related compounds
Related compounds	Benzadox-ammonium
- Except where otherwise noted, data are given for materials in their standard state (at 25 °C [77 °F], 100 kPa). Infobox references

Benzadox is an amide herbicide, first discovered in 1966 to control kochia on sugarbeet crops. Commercial benzadox products are often sold as benzadox-ammonium, benzadox's ammonium salt. See that page for its chemical properties. Benzadox is not known to be in current use, and most research about it seems to be from the 1960s and 1970s.

Benzadox appears to work by inhibiting photosynthesis, with strong inhibition of alanine aminotransferase and aspartate aminotransferase.

== Kochia control ==
Kochia was the hardest weed to control in sugarbeet around Colorado, Nebraska, Montana and Wyoming. It can emerge at any time while growing sugar beet, and grows 6 inches to 6 feet high. Benzadox came as a breakthrough since it could be applied to weeds post-emergently and selectively on sugarbeet. Selectivity on sugarbeet had been difficult, as kochia belongs to the same chenopodiaceae family.

Applied to sugar-plots in 1967 and 1968, benzadox improved yields from 740, and 2250 lbs/ac. in an unweeded control, to 960 and 3640 lb/ac with 1 lb/ac. of benzadox, up to 4860 and 7920 lb/ac. with 4 lb/ac. of benzadox. No benzadox treated plot had as high a yield as the hand-weeded plot, at 7020 and 8990 lb/ac., due to some weeds persisting and benzadox's crop injury at higher rates to the sugarbeet. The sugar content as a percentage was notably higher in the plots which were hand-weeded or treated with 2 lb/ac. or more of benzadox, because of the reduced competition from weeds.

Rain shortly after herbicide application reduced the effectiveness to virtually nothing, though rain 8 hours after application had relatively little effect. Higher temperature, 70°F compared to 55°F, increased crop injury a lot, though weed control was unaffected.

== Commercialisation ==
It has been manufactured by Murphy Chemical Co and DowElanco.

"Topcide" was a brand name of Gulf Oil Corporation, Agricultural Chemicals Division, with 22.5% benzadox-ammonium by weight, or 2 pounds per US gallon, recommending 1 gallon per acre to be sprayed, (2 lbs per acre active ingredient, or 2.24 kg/Ha) from a tractor sprayer. The 1970 version of the label says control is reduced if the temperature is below 55°F (13°C) or if it rains within 8 hours of spraying. Weeds turn brown within 2 to 5 days, and temporary yellowing or stunning of beets might occur. The mixture was not to be mixed with other herbicides.
