= Indenone =

Names
- Preferred IUPAC name 1H-Inden-1-one

Identifiers
CAS Number	480-90-0
3D model (JSmol)	Interactive image
ChemSpider	9990041
PubChem CID	11815384
UNII	B65N387LDP
CompTox Dashboard (EPA)	DTXSID80473374
- InChI: InChI=1S/C9H6O/c10-9-6-5-7-3-1-2-4-8(7)9/h1-6H Key: SNWQUNCRDLUDEX-UHFFFAOYSA-N
- SMILES: c1ccc2c(c1)C=CC2=O

Properties
Chemical formula	C_{9}H_{6}O
Molar mass	130.146 g·mol^{−1}

Hazards
- GHS labelling
Pictograms	(GHS07: Exclamation mark)
Signal word	Warning
Hazard statements	H315, H319, H335
Precautionary statements	P261, P264, P271, P280, P302+P352, P304+P340, P305+P351+P338, P312, P321, P332+P313, P337+P313, P362, P403+P233, P405, P501
- Except where otherwise noted, data are given for materials in their standard state (at 25 °C [77 °F], 100 kPa). Infobox references

Indenone is a polycyclic ketone with chemical formula C_{9}H_{6}O. It is composed of a benzene ring fused with a cyclopentenone ring. Indenones can be used as intermediates in the synthesis of more complex molecules.

== See also ==
- Indene
- Isoindenone
