= Azelaoyl chloride =

Names
- Preferred IUPAC name Nonanedioyl dichloride
- Other names Azelaic acid dichloride

Identifiers
CAS Number	123-98-8
3D model (JSmol)	Interactive image
ChemSpider	60510
ECHA InfoCard	100.004.245
EC Number	204-668-6
PubChem CID	67165
UNII	NEG67YB85G
CompTox Dashboard (EPA)	DTXSID7059561
- InChI: InChI=1S/C9H14Cl2O2/c10-8(12)6-4-2-1-3-5-7-9(11)13/h1-7H2 Key: HGEVGSTXQGZPCL-UHFFFAOYSA-N
- SMILES: C(CCCC(=O)Cl)CCCC(=O)Cl

Properties
Chemical formula	C_{9}H_{14}Cl_{2}O_{2}
Molar mass	225.11 g·mol^{−1}
Appearance	colorless liquid
Density	1.144 g/cm^{3}
Boiling point	166 °C (331 °F; 439 K) Experimentally determined

Hazards
- GHS labelling
Pictograms	(GHS05: Corrosive)
Signal word	Danger
Hazard statements	H314
Precautionary statements	P260, P264, P280, P301+P330+P331, P303+P361+P353, P304+P340, P305+P351+P338, P310, P321, P363, P405, P501
Flash point	138.9 °C (282.0 °F; 412.0 K)
- Except where otherwise noted, data are given for materials in their standard state (at 25 °C [77 °F], 100 kPa). Infobox references

Azelaoyl chloride or nonanedioyl dichloride is an organic compound with the formula (CH_{2})_{7}(COCl)_{2}. It is the diacid chloride derivative of azelaic acid. It is a colorless liquid although commercial samples can appear yellow.
