= 1-Nonanol =

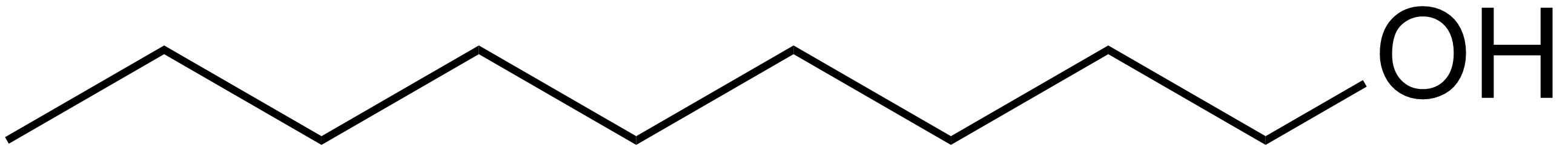
- Skeletal formula

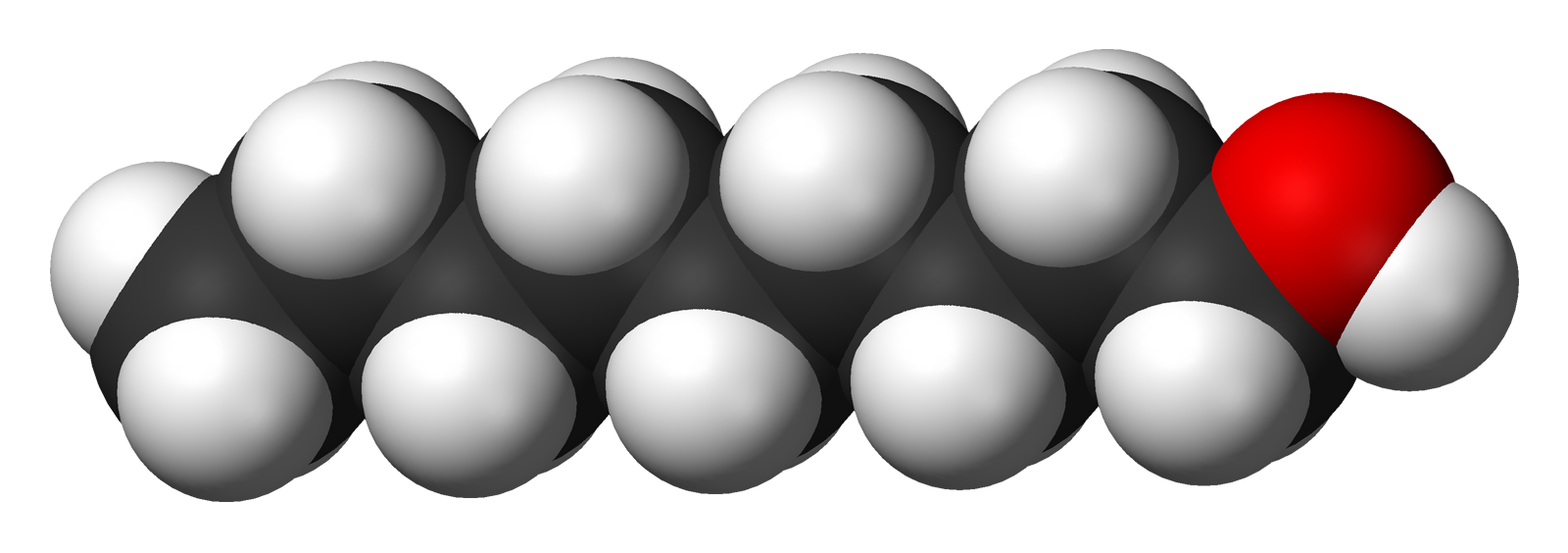
- Space-filling model

Names
- Preferred IUPAC name Nonan-1-ol
- Other names 1-Nonanol; Pelargonic alcohol Nonyl alcohol n-Nonyl alcohol

Identifiers
CAS Number	143-08-8
3D model (JSmol)	Interactive image; Interactive image
Abbreviations	NnOH n-NnOH nNnOH^{n}NnOH
ChEBI	CHEBI:35986
ChEMBL	ChEMBL24563
ChemSpider	8574
DrugBank	DB03143
ECHA InfoCard	100.005.076
KEGG	C14696
PubChem CID	8914
UNII	NGK73Q6XMC
CompTox Dashboard (EPA)	DTXSID6022008
- InChI: InChI=1S/C9H20O/c1-2-3-4-5-6-7-8-9-10/h10H,2-9H2,1H3 Key: ZWRUINPWMLAQRD-UHFFFAOYSA-N; InChI=1/C9H20O/c1-2-3-4-5-6-7-8-9-10/h10H,2-9H2,1H3 Key: ZWRUINPWMLAQRD-UHFFFAOYAC
- SMILES: OCCCCCCCCC; CCCCCCCCCO

Properties
Chemical formula	C_{9}H_{20}O
Molar mass	144.258 g·mol^{−1}
Appearance	Colorless liquid
Density	0.83 g/cm^{3}
Melting point	−6 °C (21 °F; 267 K)
Boiling point	214 °C (417 °F; 487 K)
Solubility in water	0.13 g/L

Hazards
- GHS labelling
Pictograms	(GHS07: Exclamation mark) (GHS09: Environmental hazard)
Signal word	Warning
Hazard statements	H315, H319, H411
Precautionary statements	P264, P264+P265, P273, P280, P302+P352, P305+P351+P338, P321, P332+P317, P337+P317, P362+P364, P391, P501
NFPA 704 (fire diamond)	1 2 0
Flash point	96 °C (205 °F; 369 K)
- Lethal dose or concentration (LD, LC)
LD_{50} (median dose)	3560 mg/kg (oral, rat); 4680 mg/kg (dermal, rabbit)

Related compounds
Related alcohols	2-Nonanol, 1-Octanol, 1-Decanol
Related compounds	Pelargonic acid
- Except where otherwise noted, data are given for materials in their standard state (at 25 °C [77 °F], 100 kPa). verify (what is ?) Infobox references

1-Nonanol/ˈnoʊnənɒl/ is a straight chain fatty alcohol with nine carbon atoms and the molecular formula CH_{3}(CH_{2})_{8}OH. It is a colorless oily liquid with a citrus odor similar to citronella oil.

Nonanol occurs naturally in orange oil. The primary use of nonanol is in the manufacture of artificial lemon oil. Various esters of nonanol, such as nonyl acetate, are used in perfumery and flavors.

== Nonanols ==
More common than 1-nonanol are its many isomers, including isononyl alcohol, which are typically produced by hydroformylation of octenes. Isomeric octenes are produced by dimerization of butenes. These alcohol mixtures are used as solvents in paints and as precursors to plasticizers.

== Toxicity ==
The LD50 (oral, rats) is about 2.98 g/kg.
