= 6-(Methylsulfinyl)hexyl isothiocyanate =

Names
- Preferred IUPAC name 1-Isothiocyanato-6-(methanesulfinyl)hexane
- Other names 6-MITC; 6-MSITC; Hesperin

Identifiers
CAS Number	4430-35-7
3D model (JSmol)	Interactive image
ChEBI	CHEBI:138799
ChEMBL	ChEMBL573428
ChemSpider	7991398
PubChem CID	9815648
UNII	8RUP6Q3JBB
CompTox Dashboard (EPA)	DTXSID00431173
- InChI: InChI=1S/C8H15NOS2/c1-12(10)7-5-3-2-4-6-9-8-11/h2-7H2,1H3 Key: XQZVZULJKVALRI-UHFFFAOYSA-N
- SMILES: CS(=O)CCCCCCN=C=S

Properties
Chemical formula	C_{8}H_{15}NOS_{2}
Molar mass	205.33 g·mol^{−1}
- Except where otherwise noted, data are given for materials in their standard state (at 25 °C [77 °F], 100 kPa). Infobox references

6-(Methylsulfinyl)hexyl isothiocyanate (6-MITC or 6-MSITC) is a compound consisting of an isothiocyanate group linked by an alkyl chain to a sulfoxide. 6-MITC is obtained from cruciferous vegetables, chiefly wasabi. Like other isothiocyanates, it is produced when the enzyme myrosinase transforms the associated glucosinolate into 6-MITC upon cell injury.

In 2017, there was a reported trend in Japan to apply freshly grated wasabi stem to the hair because Kinin Corporation, the world's largest wasabi producer, claims that 6-MITC promotes hair regrowth.

In a 2023 study of healthy older adults aged 60 years and over, the group taking one tablet (0.8 mg of 6-MSITC) every day for 12 weeks showed a significant improvement in working and episodic memory performances. These results have been reported in the popular press, using the name "hexaraphane" for 6-MSITC.

== See also ==
- Methyl isothiocyanate
