= Isoindenone =

Names
- IUPAC name 2H-Inden-2-one

Identifiers
CAS Number	93465-07-7
3D model (JSmol)	Interactive image
PubChem CID	15810462
UNII	8Y4R7XM2WP
CompTox Dashboard (EPA)	DTXSID501317370
- InChI: InChI=1S/C9H6O/c10-9-5-7-3-1-2-4-8(7)6-9/h1-6H Key: UQUWSELRIJLNNT-UHFFFAOYSA-N
- SMILES: C1=CC2=CC(=O)C=C2C=C1

Properties
Chemical formula	C_{9}H_{6}O
Molar mass	130.146 g·mol^{−1}
- Except where otherwise noted, data are given for materials in their standard state (at 25 °C [77 °F], 100 kPa). Infobox references

Isoindenone is a polycyclic ketone with chemical formula C_{9}H_{6}O. It is a cross-conjugated. It is unstable.

== See also ==
- Indene
- Indenone
- Isoindene
