= C9H8O3 =

The molecular formula C_{9}H_{8}O_{3} (molar mass : 164.16 g/mol, exact mass : 164.047344) may refer to:

- Caffeic aldehyde, a phenolic aldehyde contained in the seeds of Phytolacca americana
- Coumaric acids
  - o-Coumaric acid
  - p-Coumaric acid
  - m-Coumaric acid
- Phenylpyruvic acid
- Diformylcresol
- Nadic anhydride
