= Dichlofluanid =

Names
- IUPAC name N-{[Dichloro(fluoro)methyl]sulfanyl}-N′,N′-dimethyl-N-phenylsulfuric diamide

Identifiers
CAS Number	1085-98-9
3D model (JSmol)	Interactive image
ChemSpider	13520
ECHA InfoCard	100.012.835
PubChem CID	14145
UNII	76A92XU36Y
CompTox Dashboard (EPA)	DTXSID5041851
- InChI: InChI=1S/C9H11Cl2FN2O2S2/c1-13(2)18(15,16)14(17-9(10,11)12)8-6-4-3-5-7-8/h3-7H,1-2H3 Key: WURGXGVFSMYFCG-UHFFFAOYSA-N; InChI=1/C9H11Cl2FN2O2S2/c1-13(2)18(15,16)14(17-9(10,11)12)8-6-4-3-5-7-8/h3-7H,1-2H3 Key: WURGXGVFSMYFCG-UHFFFAOYAE
- SMILES: CN(C)S(=O)(=O)N(C1=CC=CC=C1)SC(F)(Cl)Cl

Properties
Chemical formula	C_{9}H_{11}Cl_{2}FN_{2}O_{2}S_{2}
Molar mass	333.22 g·mol^{−1}
Density	1.55 g/cm^{3}
Melting point	105–106 °C (221–223 °F; 378–379 K)

Hazards
- Lethal dose or concentration (LD, LC)
LD_{50} (median dose)	2500 mg/kg (rat)
- Except where otherwise noted, data are given for materials in their standard state (at 25 °C [77 °F], 100 kPa). Infobox references

Dichlofluanid (N-dichlorofluoromethylthio-N′, N′-dimethyl-N-phenylsulfamide) is a fungicide used to protect strawberries, grapes, berries, apples, pears and other fruit, vegetables and ornamental plants from diseases such as apple scab (Venturia inaequalis), black spot, leather rot, gray mold, downy mildew and others caused by the fungi Botrytis, Alternaria, Sclerotinia, and Monilinia. It is also used to protect against diseases of fruit during storage, and as a wood preservative, often as part of a paint undercoat.

Dichlofluanid was first marketed by Bayer Company in 1964, for use as a fungicide on plants. Its trade names include Euparen and Elvaron.
