= Methyl thiocyanate =

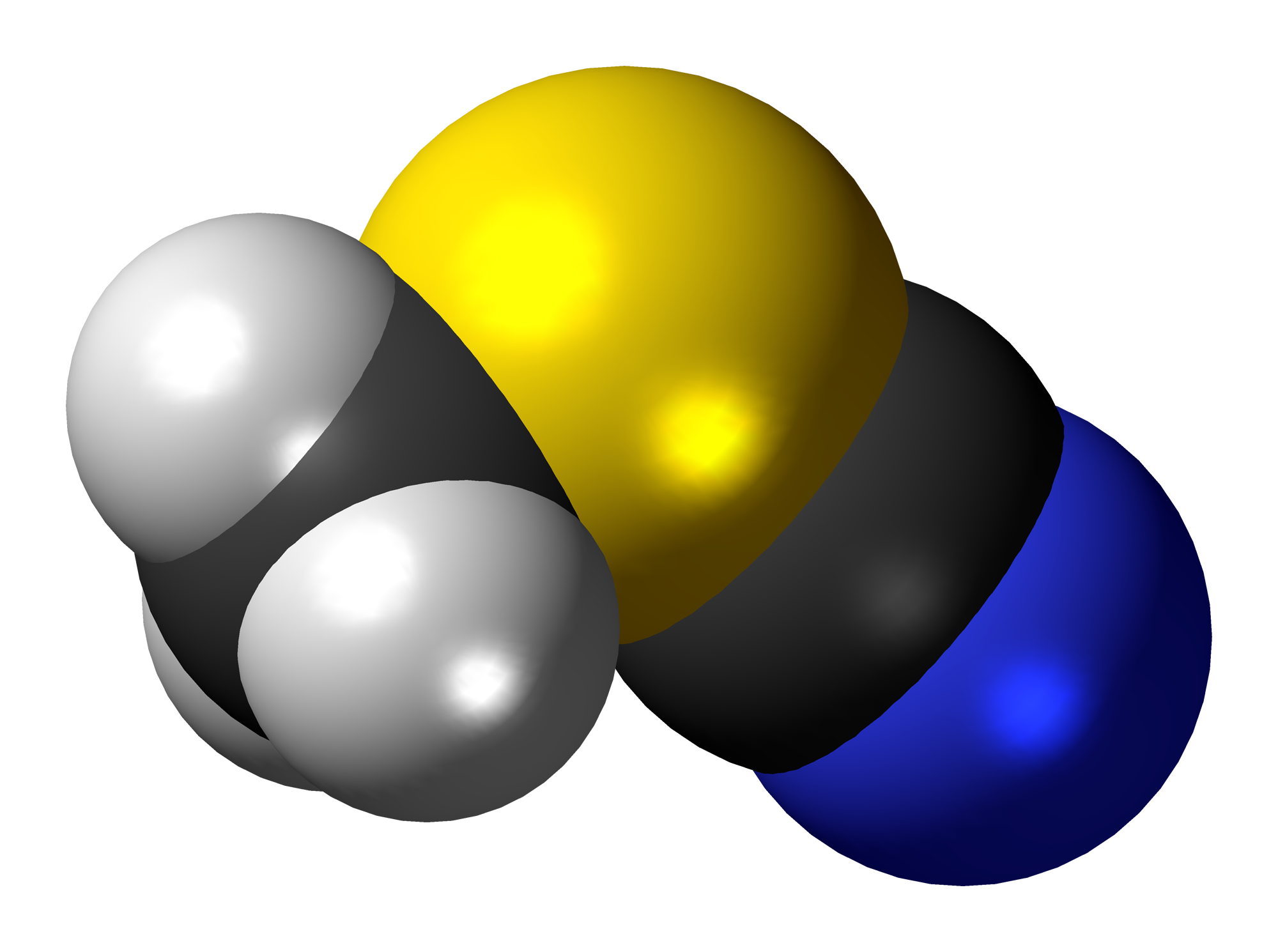

Names
- Preferred IUPAC name Methyl thiocyanate
- Other names Thiocyanic acid methyl ester; Methylrhodanid; methylrhodanate; Methylthiokyanat; Thiocyanomethane; Methyl rhodanide; Methyl thiocyanate; thiocyanato-methan; methylsulfocyanate; Methylsalfocyanate

Identifiers
| CAS Number | 556-64-9 |
| 3D model (JSmol) | Interactive image |
| ChEBI | CHEBI:61112 |
| ChemSpider | 10695 |
| ECHA InfoCard | 100.008.305 |
| EC Number | 209-134-6 |
| MeSH | C047435 |
| PubChem CID | 11168 |
| UNII | 55I23VY6IE |
| UN number | 2929 1935 |
| CompTox Dashboard (EPA) | DTXSID5060304 |
- InChI: InChI=1S/C2H3NS/c1-4-2-3/h1H3 Key: VYHVQEYOFIYNJP-UHFFFAOYSA-N
- SMILES: N#CSC

Properties
| Chemical formula | C_{2}H_{3}NS |
| Molar mass | 73.117 |
| Appearance | Colourless liquid |
| Density | 1.074 g/cm^{3} |
| Melting point | −51 °C (−60 °F; 222 K) |
| Boiling point | 132 °C (270 °F; 405 K) (101.3 kP) |
| Solubility in water | Slightly soluble |
| Solubility in Diethyl ether | Miscible |

Structure
| Molecular shape | bent C-S-CN |

Hazards
- GHS labelling
| Pictograms | (GHS02: Flammable) (GHS06: Toxic) (GHS07: Exclamation mark) |
| Signal word | Danger |
| Hazard statements | H226, H301, H311, H315, H319, H330, H331, H335 |
| Precautionary statements | P210, P233, P240, P241, P242, P243, P260, P264, P270, P271, P280, P284, P301+P310, P302+P352, P303+P361+P353, P304+P340, P305+P351+P338, P310, P311, P312, P320, P321, P330, P332+P313, P337+P313, P361, P362, P363, P370+P378, P403+P233, P403+P235, P405, P501 |
| NFPA 704 (fire diamond) | 3 3 0 |
| Flash point | 38 °C (100 °F; 311 K) |

Related compounds
| Related compounds | Methyl isocyanate Methyl isothiocyanate |
- Except where otherwise noted, data are given for materials in their standard state (at 25 °C [77 °F], 100 kPa). Infobox references

Methyl thiocyanate is an organic compound with the formula CH_{3}SCN. The simplest member of the organic thiocyanates, it is a colourless liquid with an onion-like odor. It is produced by the methylation of thiocyanate salts. The compound is a precursor to the more useful isomer methyl isothiocyanate (CH_{3}NCS).

== Safety ==
The LD_{50} is 60 mg/kg (rats, oral).

It is listed as an extremely hazardous substance by the United States's Emergency Planning and Community Right-to-Know Act.
