= Methyl isothiocyanate =

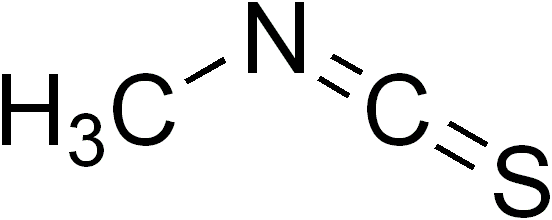

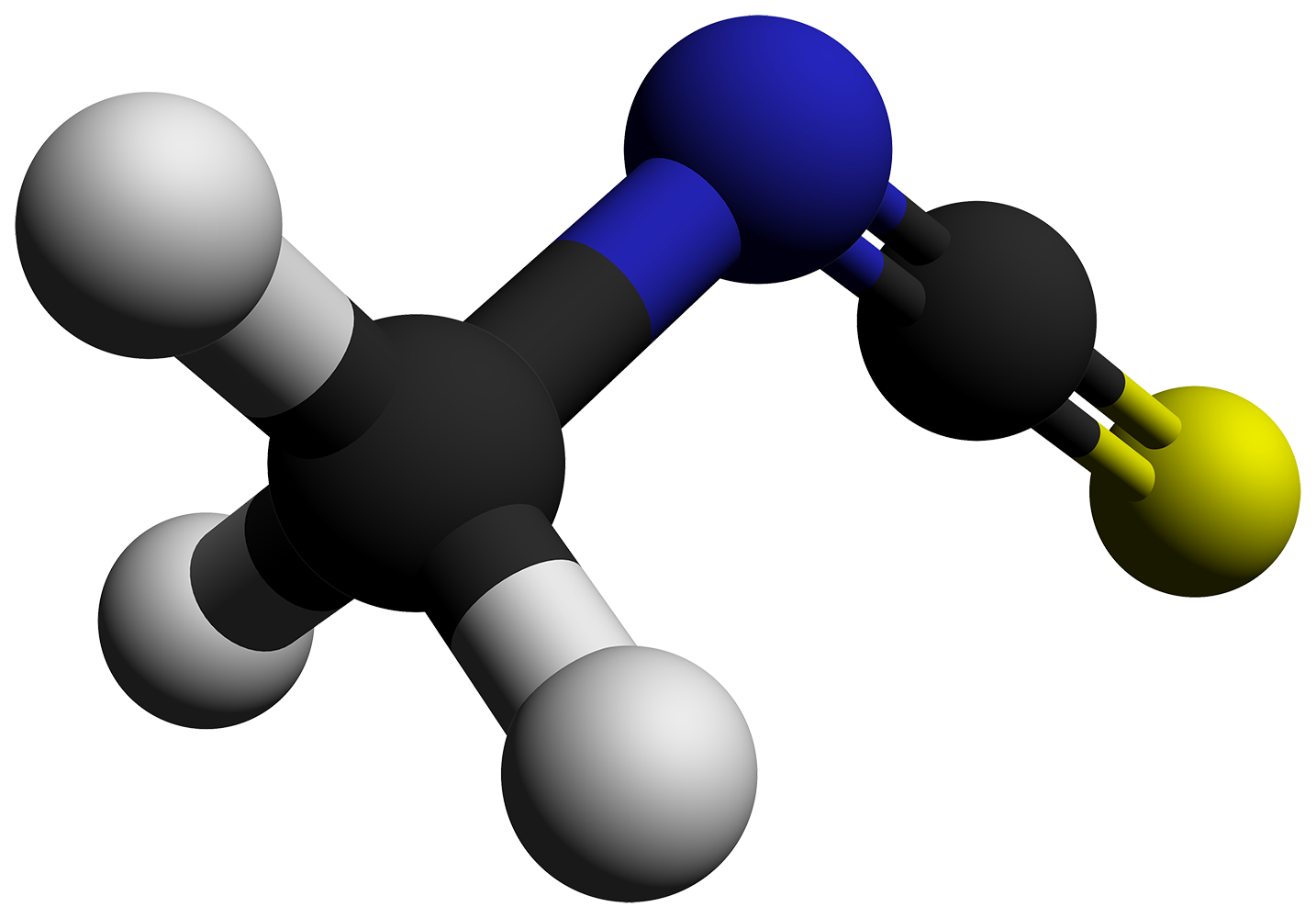

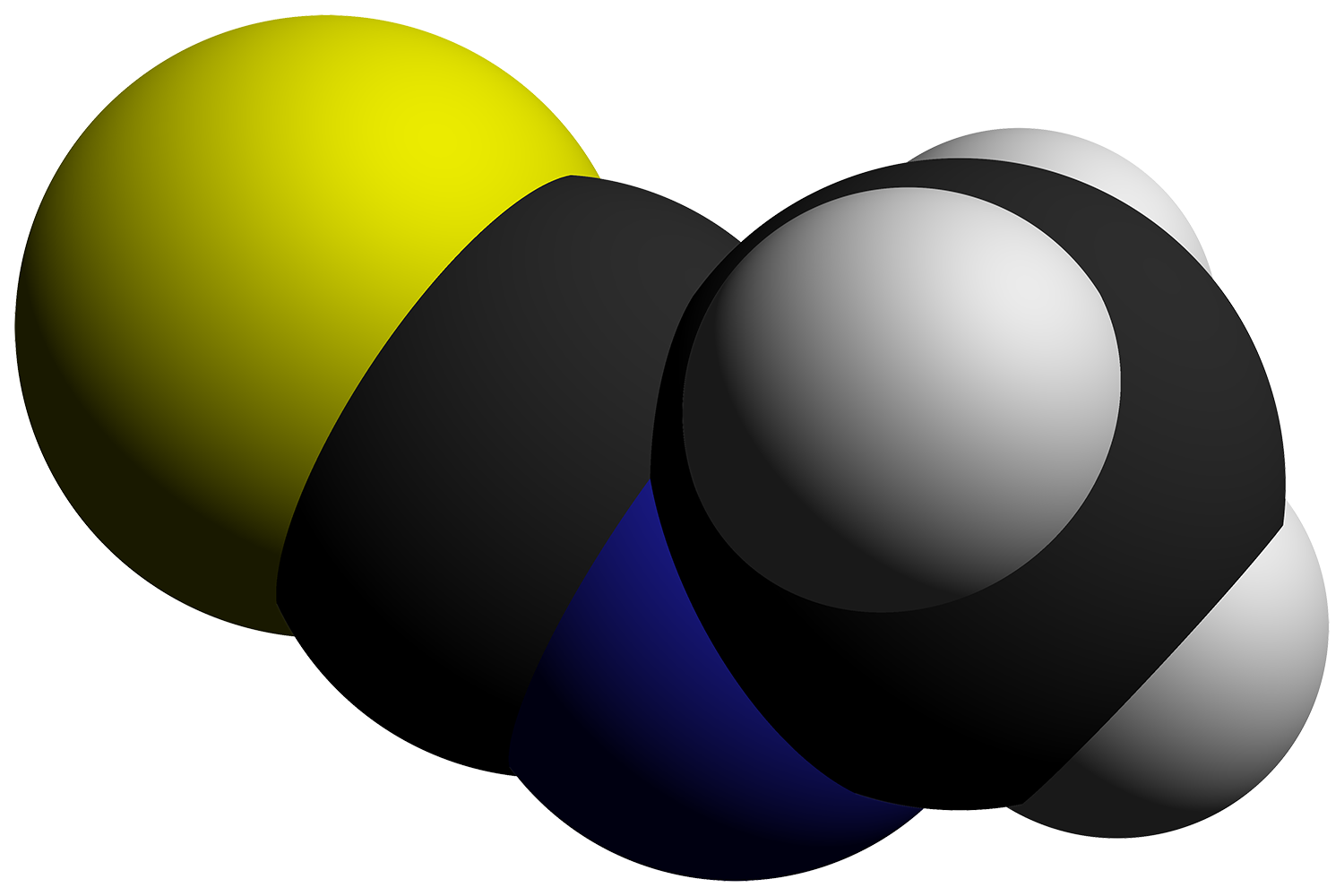

Names
- Preferred IUPAC name Isothiocyanatomethane
- Other names MITC, Trapex, Trapex, Vorlex, MITC-Fume, MIT, Morton EP-161E, WN 12

Identifiers
CAS Number	556-61-6
3D model (JSmol)	Interactive image
ChEBI	CHEBI:78337
ChEMBL	ChEMBL396000
ChemSpider	10694
ECHA InfoCard	100.008.303
EC Number	209-132-5
KEGG	C18587
PubChem CID	11167
UNII	RWE2M5YDW1
UN number	2477
CompTox Dashboard (EPA)	DTXSID2027204
- InChI: InChI=1S/C2H3NS/c1-3-2-4/h1H3 Key: LGDSHSYDSCRFAB-UHFFFAOYSA-N; InChI=1/C2H3NS/c1-3-2-4/h1H3 Key: LGDSHSYDSCRFAB-UHFFFAOYAS
- SMILES: S=C=NC

Properties
Chemical formula	CH_{3}NCS
Molar mass	73.11 g·mol^{−1}
Appearance	colourless solid
Density	1.07 g/cm^{3}
Melting point	31 °C (88 °F; 304 K)
Boiling point	117 °C (243 °F; 390 K)
Solubility in water	8.2 g/l

Hazards
- GHS labelling
Pictograms	(GHS05: Corrosive) (GHS06: Toxic) (GHS07: Exclamation mark) (GHS09: Environmental hazard)
Signal word	Danger
Hazard statements	H301, H314, H317, H331, H410
Precautionary statements	P260, P264, P270, P271, P272, P273, P280, P301+P310, P301+P330+P331, P302+P352, P303+P361+P353, P304+P340, P305+P351+P338, P310, P311, P321, P330, P333+P313, P363, P391, P403+P233, P405, P501
NFPA 704 (fire diamond)	3 1 1
Safety data sheet (SDS)	ACC# 07204

Structure
Dipole moment	3.528 D

Related compounds
Related compounds	Methyl isocyanate Methyl thiocyanate
- Except where otherwise noted, data are given for materials in their standard state (at 25 °C [77 °F], 100 kPa). verify (what is ?) Infobox references

Methyl isothiocyanate is the organosulfur compound with the formula CH_{3}−N=C=S. This low melting colorless solid is a powerful lachrymator. As a precursor to a variety of valuable bioactive compounds, it is the most important organic isothiocyanate in industry.

== Synthesis ==
It is prepared industrially by two routes. Annual production in 1993 was estimated to be 4,000 tonnes. The main method involves the thermal rearrangement of methyl thiocyanate:

CH_{3}−S−C≡N → CH_{3}−N=C=S

It is also prepared via with the reaction of methylamine with carbon disulfide followed by oxidation of the resulting dithiocarbamate with hydrogen peroxide. A related method is useful to prepare this compound in the laboratory.

MITC forms naturally upon the enzymatic degradation of glucocapparin, a glucoside found in capers.

== Reactions ==
A characteristic reaction is with amines to give methyl thioureas:

CH_{3}NCS + R_{2}NH → R_{2}NC(S)NHCH_{3}

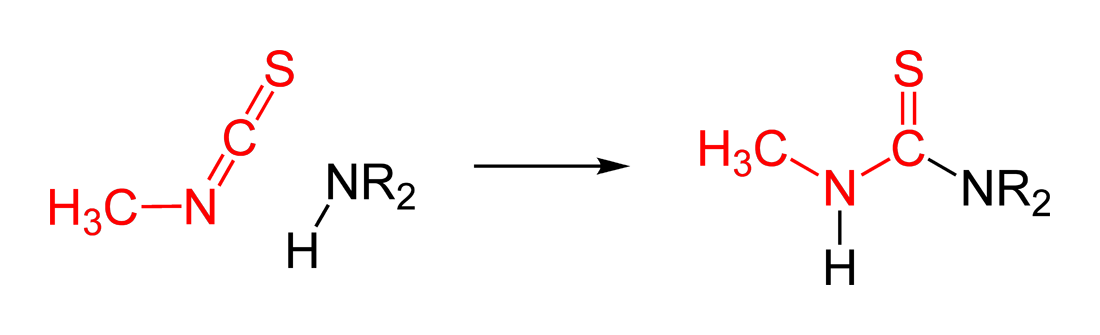

Other nucleophiles add similarly.

== Applications ==
Solutions of MITC are used in agriculture as soil fumigants, mainly for protection against fungi and nematodes.

MITC is a building block for the synthesis of 1,3,4-thiadiazoles, which are heterocyclic compounds used as herbicides. Commercial products include "Spike", "Ustilan," and "Erbotan."

Well known pharmaceuticals prepared using MITC include Zantac and Tagamet. Suritozole is a third example.

MITC is used in the Etasuline patent (Ex2), although the compound is question (Ex6) is with EITC.

== Safety ==
MITC is a dangerous lachrymator as well as being poisonous.

== See also ==
- 6-MITC
- Bhopal disaster
