= Cyanazine =

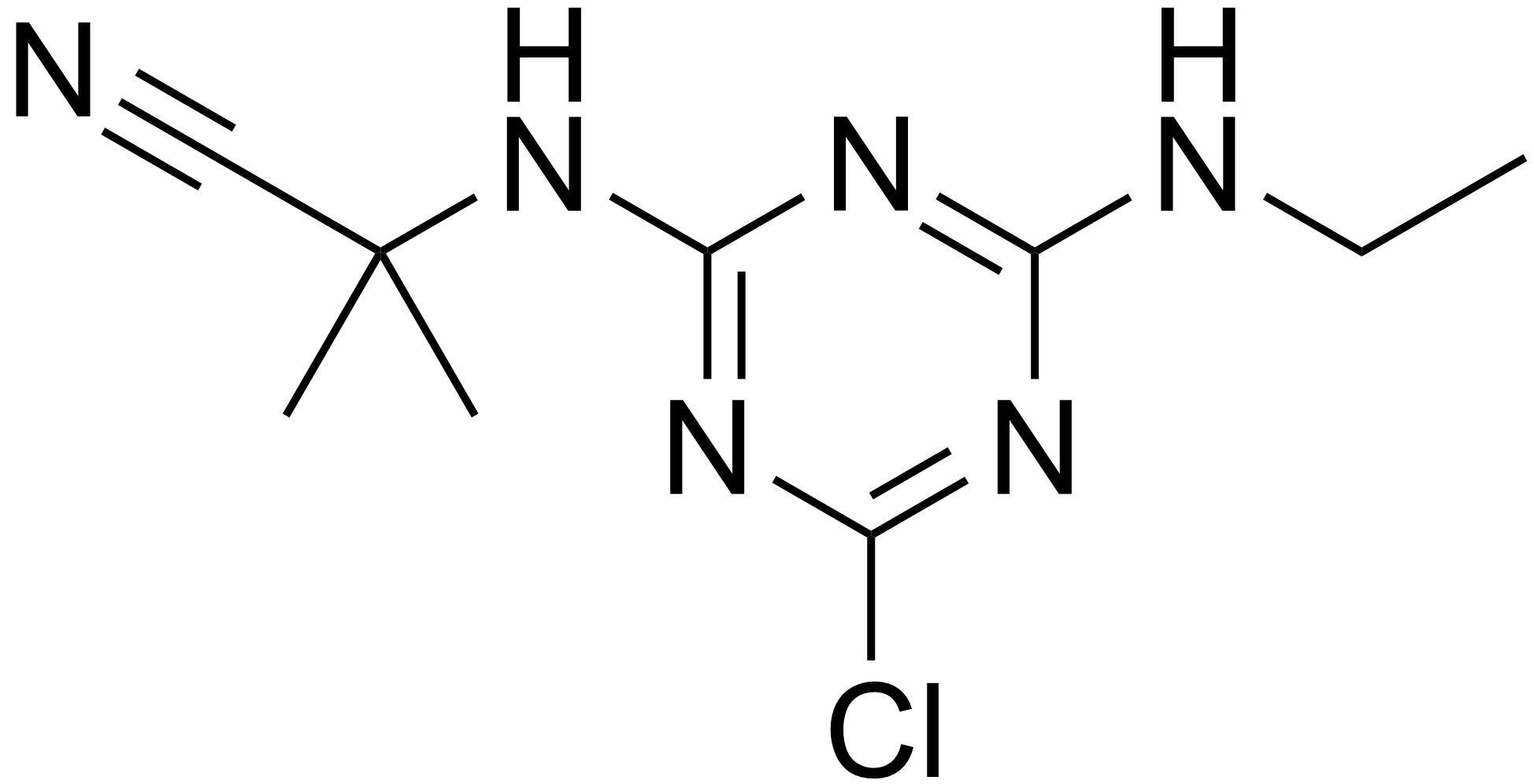
- Cyanazine

Names
- Preferred IUPAC name 2-{[4-Chloro-6-(ethylamino)-1,3,5-triazin-2-yl]amino}-2-methylpropanenitrile

Identifiers
CAS Number	21725-46-2
3D model (JSmol)	Interactive image
ChEBI	CHEBI:38069
ChEMBL	ChEMBL1884229
ChemSpider	28552
ECHA InfoCard	100.040.480
PubChem CID	30773
RTECS number	UG1490000
UNII	W34C4P18WD
UN number	2811, 2763
CompTox Dashboard (EPA)	DTXSID1023990
- InChI: InChI=1S/C9H13ClN6/c1-4-12-7-13-6(10)14-8(15-7)16-9(2,3)5-11/h4H2,1-3H3,(H2,12,13,14,15,16) Key: MZZBPDKVEFVLFF-UHFFFAOYSA-N
- SMILES: CCNC1=NC(=NC(=N1)Cl)NC(C)(C)C#N

Properties
Chemical formula	C_{9}H_{13}ClN_{6}
Molar mass	240.70 g·mol^{−1}
Appearance	White crystals
Density	1.26 g/cm^{3}
Melting point	168 °C (334 °F; 441 K)
Solubility in water	170 mg/L

Hazards
- GHS labelling
Pictograms	(GHS07: Exclamation mark) (GHS09: Environmental hazard)
Signal word	Warning
Hazard statements	H302, H410
Precautionary statements	P264, P270, P273, P301+P312, P330, P391, P501
- Except where otherwise noted, data are given for materials in their standard state (at 25 °C [77 °F], 100 kPa). Infobox references

Cyanazine is a herbicide that belongs to the group of triazines. Cyanazine inhibits photosynthesis and is therefore used as a herbicide.

== History ==
Cyanazine is used as a herbicide to control annual grasses and broadleaf weeds. It belongs to the group of triazine herbicides, just as atrazine. These pesticides work by inhibiting photosynthesis. The majority of the cyanazine used is used for corn. In 1985 this was 96% of the used cyanazine. The Environmental Protection Agency (EPA) made a profile on the Health and Environmental effects of cyanazine in 1984. In 1971 cyanazine was brought on the market under the names 'Bladex' and 'Fortol' by Shell. Cyanazine and the other triazines have been among the group of most heavily used herbicides in the mid-west and the United States of America. In 2002 the European Union pesticides database disapproved the usage of cyanazine as a herbicide. It is classified as a teratogen on the Hazardous Substance List, already in 1986.

== Structure and reactivity ==
Cyanazine is the common name for 2-chloro-4-(1-cyano-1-methylethyl-amino)-6-ethylamine-1,3,5-triazine. The molecular formula for this compound is C_{9}H_{13}ClN_{6}, molecular weight is 240.695 g/mol. Cyanazine is a white or colourless crystalline solid. The melting point is around 166.5-167.0 °C. The logP is 2.22.

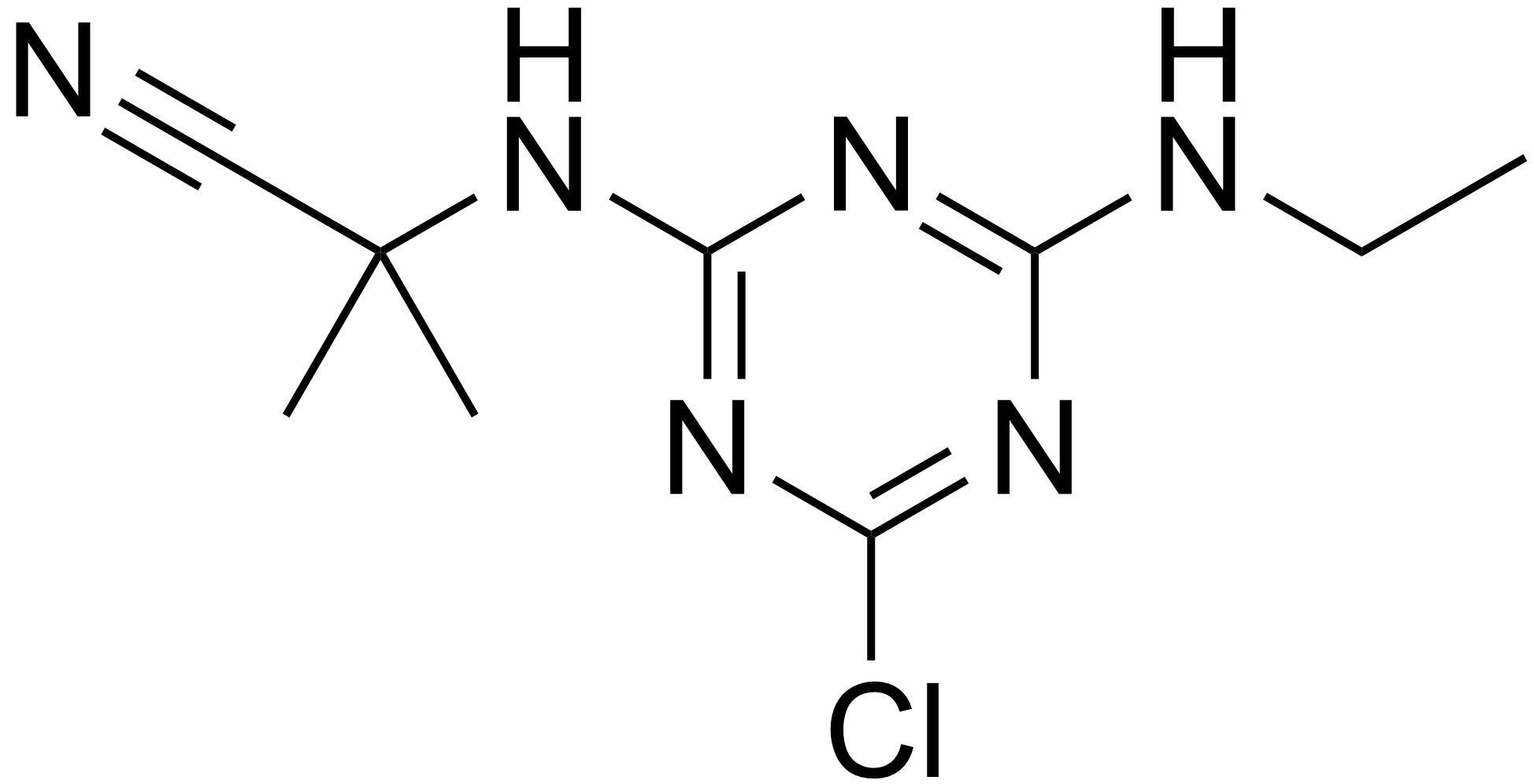
Structure of Cyanazine

Cyanazine is not very reactive in neutral and slightly acidic/basic media, it is hydrolysed by strong acids and bases. It is stable to heat, light and to hydrolysis. It is also stable to UV irradiation under practical conditions. Cyanazine can decompose on heating. This produces corrosive fumes of hydrogen chloride, nitrogen oxides and cyanides.

Cyanazine has one of the lowest rate constant of reactivity with ozone from different pesticides. Among four different herbicide groups, cyanazine degrades the fastest in soil.

== Synthesis ==
Cyanazine is a chloro-1,3,5-triazine that is substituted at positions 6 and 4 by an ethyl amino and an amino group respectively. It can be prepared by reacting cyanuric chloride with ethylamine and 2-amino-2-methylpropionitrile.

== Available forms ==
Cyanazine is available as a soluble concentrate, flowable concentrate, emulsifiable concentrate, wettable powder and granular product

== Mechanisms of action ==
Cyanazine inhibits photosynthesis and is therefore used as a herbicide. It destroys unwanted vegetation, especially various types of weeds, grasses and woody plants. The primary site of inhibition was on the reducing side of photosystem II. They inhibit the electron transfer step between the primary electron acceptor (Q) and the plastoquinone pool of the electron transport chain.

== Metabolism ==
The metabolism pathways of cyanazine have been describe for different animal and plant species. Different studies showed that in animal models (rats, dogs & cows) the cyanazine is quickly absorbed in the intestines. For the degradation of the absorbed cyanazine the following metabolic pathways are involved: de-alkylation & conjugation with glutathione, which results in different metabolites. After undergoing these metabolic pathways the metabolites leave the body in the urine and feces. For example, in rats there were found seven metabolites in urine and feces after oral intake of cyanazine. Another major route of degradation for cyanazine in mammals is N-De-ethylation, which leads to the yield of an ethyl group. The free ethyl group will then by excreted by breathing. In plants the following metabolic pathways are involved hydrolysis, N-de-alkylation and conjugation with glutathione, resulting in different metabolites (shown in the figure below).

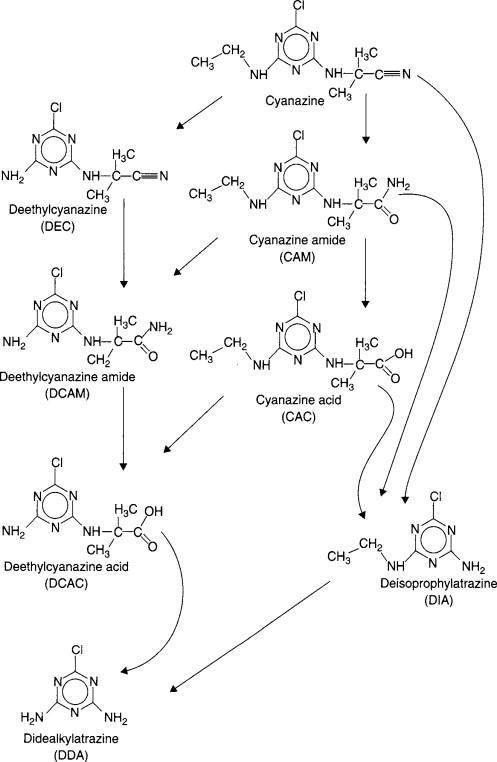
Degradation of cyanazine in plants

== Indications ==
Cyanazine is used as a herbicide to control annual grasses and broadleaf weeds in corn, grain, sorghum, cotton and wheat fallow.

== Efficacy ==
Cyanazine is used in the following doses: for preventing weeds, a dose of 0,14 kg/km2 – 0,54 kg/km2 is used. To treat existing weeds, 0.136 kg/km2 – 0,23 kg/km2 is used.

In animals and algae, the LD50/LC50/EC50 are as following:

Indicator	Species,intake route	Dose
LD50	Rat, oral	149 – 334 mg/kg
LD50	Rat, dermal	>1200 mg/kg
LD50	Rabbit, oral	141 mg/kg
LD50	Rabbit, dermal	<2000 mg/kg
LD50	Quail, oral	400 mg/kg
LD50	Duck, oral	750 mg/kg
LC50	Channel catfish	17.4 mg/L/96h
LC50	Rainbow trout	9.0 mg/L/96h
LC50	Fathead Minnow	16.3 – 21.3 mg/L/96h
EC50	Freshwater green algae	20 PPB
EC50	Water flea	49 PPM

After repeated doses of 25 ppm cyanazine mixed in rat diets, no toxic effects were seen.

== Adverse effects ==
Cyanazine was found to pollute surface waters and drinking waters in multiple countries in North America and in groundwaters in the Netherlands. However, cyanazine or cyanazine degradation products have not been detected in food. Based on data from Canada and the Netherlands, intake from drinking water is around an estimate 0.2-0.3 μg/day. The World Health Organization (WHO) set a maximum value of 0.198 μg/kg body weight, due to possible toxic effects to humans. Furthermore, as seen in the table above, aquatic lifeforms are affected at a much lower concentration of cyanazine than terrestrial animals. That, combined with the fact that cyanazine quickly washes out of the soil to the surrounding waters, makes that the aquatic ecosystems are most compromised by cyanazine.

== Toxicity ==
Triazine herbicides like cyanazine are extremely toxic to certain types of plants. This is why they are so effective in killing specific species of broadleaf weeds. Cyanazine will result in the dysfunction of photosystem II by binding important proteins which are required for this process. When this important step in photosynthesis fails, a plant is not able to produce sugars which are crucial for its growth and metabolism.

== Toxicity in humans ==
- Acute effects

Contact with cyanazine may cause dermatitis depending on the severity of the contact. Also, when high levels of cyanazine are being ingested, acute toxicity can occur. Inhalation of cyanazine fumes may lead to airway irritation.

- Carcinogenesis

The carcinogenic effects of cyanazine were unclear for a long time. However, it is not likely that this herbicide will have any carcinogenic effects on humans. More research is needed to fully confirm that cyanazine is not carcinogenic. This is why the USEPA rated cyanazine as a group C chemical; this means that it could be carcinogenic.

== Toxicity in animals ==
- Endocrine-related effects

Research has shown that atrazine is able to influence the LH and prolactin secretion of female rats. These hormonal changes appear to be caused by an altered function of the pituitary. As cyanazine belongs to the same class of herbicides as atrazine, the effect on the hormonal status of rats by cyanazine could be the same. Cyanazine may also influence GABAA-receptors in the brain of rats, depending on the dosage that is given. This can cause disruptions in GnRH-release.

- Teratogenesis

Cyanazine may cause malformations in the embryonal development of some species. In Silurana tropicalis, exposure to triazine herbicides like cyanazine may cause severe abnormalities. It is unclear whether these effects could be seen in humans too. Also, eye defects in rat foetuses could be the effect of toxic properties of cyanazine.

- Synergistic toxicity

Different triazine herbicides appear to have a synergistic effect on specific animal species. In the case of cyanazine, atrazine can cause effects on non-target species like Chironomus tentans. Atrazine is able to influence the activity of P450 enzymes in midges and therefore cause increased toxicity of these herbicides.
