= Metolcarb =

Names
- Preferred IUPAC name 3-Methylphenyl methylcarbamate
- Other names m-Tolyl methylcarbamate; MTMC

Identifiers
CAS Number	1129-41-5
3D model (JSmol)	Interactive image
ChemSpider	13684
ECHA InfoCard	100.013.133
PubChem CID	14322
UNII	4N7OMZ879V
CompTox Dashboard (EPA)	DTXSID8057938
- InChI: InChI=1S/C9H11NO2/c1-7-4-3-5-8(6-7)12-9(11)10-2/h3-6H,1-2H3,(H,10,11) Key: VOEYXMAFNDNNED-UHFFFAOYSA-N; InChI=1/C9H11NO2/c1-7-4-3-5-8(6-7)12-9(11)10-2/h3-6H,1-2H3,(H,10,11) Key: VOEYXMAFNDNNED-UHFFFAOYAZ
- SMILES: O=C(Oc1cc(ccc1)C)NC

Properties
Chemical formula	C_{9}H_{11}NO_{2}
Molar mass	165.192 g·mol^{−1}
- Except where otherwise noted, data are given for materials in their standard state (at 25 °C [77 °F], 100 kPa). Infobox references

Metolcarb (chemical formula: C_{9}H_{11}NO_{2}) is a chemical compound used as an acaricide and an insecticide.
