= Trans-3-Methyl-4-octanolide =

trans-3-Methyl-4-octanolide

Names
- IUPAC name (4R,5S)-5-butyl-4-methyldihydrofuran-2(3H)-one

Identifiers
CAS Number	(4R,5S): 105119-22-0 (-); (4S,5R): 80041-01-6 (+)
3D model (JSmol)	(4R,5S): Interactive image; (4S,5R): Interactive image
ChemSpider	(4R,5S): 9280733; (4S,5R): 9259269
PubChem CID	(4R,5S): 11105597; (4S,5R): 11084123
UNII	(4R,5S): 9OQS29SV9M; (4S,5R): 7A29T3GS95
CompTox Dashboard (EPA)	(4S,5R): DTXSID801017484
- InChI: InChI=1S/C9H16O2/c1-3-4-5-8-7(2)6-9(10)11-8/h7-8H,3-6H2,1-2H3/t7-,8+/m1/s1; (4R,5S): InChI=1S/C9H16O2/c1-3-4-5-8-7(2)6-9(10)11-8/h7-8H,3-6H2,1-2H3/t7-,8+/m0/s1
- SMILES: (4R,5S): O=C1O[C@@H](CCCC)[C@@H](C1)C; (4S,5R): CCCC[C@H]1OC(=O)C[C@@H]1C

Properties
Chemical formula	C_{9}H_{16}O_{2}
Molar mass	156.222
- Except where otherwise noted, data are given for materials in their standard state (at 25 °C [77 °F], 100 kPa). verify (what is ?) Infobox references

trans-3-Methyl-4-octanolide, also called trans-β-methyl-γ-octalactone is a chemical compound of the lactone family with formula C_{9}H_{16}O_{2}. It exists in two stereoisomers: (3R,4S) and (3S,4R).

The (3S,4R) form is found in whiskey and other alcoholic beverages that have been aged in oak barrels, together with the more important cis isomer. It has a coconut, celery or fresh wood aroma, that can be detected by humans at the concentration of 20 μg/L in air. A mixture of the cis and trans isomers is repellent for mosquitos and flies.

The (3S,4R) isomer is extracted by the alcoholic beverage from some precursor substances in the oak wood. It can be synthesized in various ways.

== See also ==
- cis-3-Methyl-4-octanolide, the more important stereoisomer

3-Methyl-4-octanolide, cis and trans isomers.
