= Γ-Nonalactone =

γ-Nonalactone

Names
- IUPAC name 5-Pentyloxolan-2-one

Identifiers
CAS Number	104-61-0
3D model (JSmol)	Interactive image
ChEBI	CHEBI:10575
ChEMBL	ChEMBL191935
ChemSpider	7424
ECHA InfoCard	100.002.927
EC Number	203-219-1
KEGG	C08501
PubChem CID	7710
UNII	I1XGH66S8P
CompTox Dashboard (EPA)	DTXSID0034229
- InChI: InChI=1S/C9H16O2/c1-2-3-4-5-8-6-7-9(10)11-8/h8H,2-7H2,1H3 Key: OALYTRUKMRCXNH-UHFFFAOYSA-N
- SMILES: CCCCCC1CCC(=O)O1

Properties
Chemical formula	C_{9}H_{16}O_{2}
Molar mass	156.225 g·mol^{−1}
- Except where otherwise noted, data are given for materials in their standard state (at 25 °C [77 °F], 100 kPa). (what is ?) Infobox references

γ-Nonalactone is an organic compound with the formula cyclo-O=COCHRCH_{2}CH_{2}. It is a weakly volatile liquid that is colorless when pure, but typical samples are not. It is one of several gamma lactones. Most have fruity scents and several are used commercially.

== Synthesis ==
The chemical synthesis has been described.

== See also ==
- δ-Nonalactone
- Cyclotene
