= Ammonium cinnamate =

Names
- IUPAC name azanium;3-phenylprop-2-enoate

Identifiers
CAS Number	25459-05-6
3D model (JSmol)	Interactive image
ChemSpider	11445295
PubChem CID	6432274
CompTox Dashboard (EPA)	DTXSID60424081
- InChI: InChI=1S/C9H8O2.H3N/c10-9(11)7-6-8-4-2-1-3-5-8;/h1-7H,(H,10,11);1H3/b7-6+; Key: PBLWYVAEJYQTLU-UHDJGPCESA-N
- SMILES: C1=CC=C(C=C1)C=CC(=O)[O-].[NH4+]

Properties
Chemical formula	C_{9}H_{11}NO_{2}
Molar mass	165.192 g·mol^{−1}
- Except where otherwise noted, data are given for materials in their standard state (at 25 °C [77 °F], 100 kPa). Infobox references

Ammonium cinnamate is an organic chemical compound with the chemical formula C_{9}H_{11}NO_{2}. This is an organic ammonium salt of cinnamic acid.

== Synthesis ==
The compound can be obtained via reaction of ammonia with aqueous solution of cinnamic acid.

== Uses ==
The compound is used in chemical synthesis and pharmaceutical applications.
