= Δ-Nonalactone =

δ-Nonalactone

Names
- IUPAC name 6-Butyloxan-2-one
- Other names 5-Hydroxynonanoic acid lactone & 5-Nonanolide.

Identifiers
CAS Number	3301-94-8
3D model (JSmol)	Interactive image
ChemSpider	17658
ECHA InfoCard	100.019.977
PubChem CID	18698
UNII	DMB99B4WCF
CompTox Dashboard (EPA)	DTXSID70863149
- InChI: InChI=1S/C9H16O2/c1-2-3-5-8-6-4-7-9(10)11-8/h8H,2-7H2,1H3 Key: PXRBWNLUQYZAAX-UHFFFAOYSA-N; InChI=1/C9H16O2/c1-2-3-5-8-6-4-7-9(10)11-8/h8H,2-7H2,1H3 Key: PXRBWNLUQYZAAX-UHFFFAOYAT
- SMILES: CCCCC1CCCC(=O)O1

Properties
Chemical formula	C_{9}H_{16}O_{2}
Molar mass	156.225 g·mol^{−1}
- Except where otherwise noted, data are given for materials in their standard state (at 25 °C [77 °F], 100 kPa). (what is ?) Infobox references

δ-Nonalactone (5-Nonanolide) is a chemical compound found in bourbon whiskey.

== See also ==
- γ-Nonalactone
