= 2,6-Dimethyl-2-heptanol =

Names
- Other names Dimetol

Identifiers
CAS Number	13254-34-7
3D model (JSmol)	Interactive image
ChEMBL	ChEMBL3187118
ChemSpider	75130
ECHA InfoCard	100.032.935
EC Number	236-244-1
PubChem CID	83268
UNII	991142090Z
CompTox Dashboard (EPA)	DTXSID6041424
- InChI: InChI=1S/C9H20O/c1-8(2)6-5-7-9(3,4)10/h8,10H,5-7H2,1-4H3 Key: HGDVHRITTGWMJK-UHFFFAOYSA-N
- SMILES: CC(C)CCCC(C)(C)O

Properties
Chemical formula	C_{9}H_{20}O
Molar mass	144.258 g·mol^{−1}
Appearance	colorless liquid
Density	0.8186 g/cm^{3}
Boiling point	170–172 °C (338–342 °F; 443–445 K) 101.3 kPa
Refractive index (n_{D})	1.4248

Hazards
- GHS labelling
Pictograms	(GHS07: Exclamation mark)
Signal word	Warning
Hazard statements	H315, H319
Precautionary statements	P264, P264+P265, P280, P302+P352, P305+P351+P338, P321, P332+P317, P337+P317, P362+P364
- Except where otherwise noted, data are given for materials in their standard state (at 25 °C [77 °F], 100 kPa). Infobox references

2,6-Dimethyl-2-heptanol is the organic compound with the formula (CH_{3})_{2}CH(CH_{2})_{3}C(OH)(CH_{3})_{2}. Structurally, it is classified as a tertiary alcohol. It is a component of commercial fragrances. The compound is produced from 6-methyl-5-hepten-2-one.
