= 3,5,5-Trimethyl-hexan-1-ol =

Names
- Preferred IUPAC name 3,5,5-Trimethylhexan-1-ol
- Other names Nonylol; Trimethylhexanol

Identifiers
CAS Number	3452-97-9
3D model (JSmol)	Interactive image
ChEBI	CHEBI:178388
ChemSpider	17881
ECHA InfoCard	100.020.343
EC Number	222-376-7
MeSH	3,5,5-trimethyl-1-hexanol
UNII	O5KUD6I57K
CompTox Dashboard (EPA)	DTXSID7029661
- InChI: InChI=1S/C9H20O/c1-8(5-6-10)7-9(2,3)4/h8,10H,5-7H2,1-4H3
- SMILES: CC(CCO)CC(C)(C)C

Properties
Chemical formula	C_{9}H_{20}O
Molar mass	144.258 g·mol^{−1}
Appearance	Clear liquid
Odor	herbaceous, plant-like
Density	0.824 g/mL
Melting point	−70 °C
Boiling point	194.0 °C
Solubility in water	0.45 g/L
Solubility	Soluble in alcohol, acetone, ester
Vapor pressure	0.2 torr
Henry's law constant (k_{H})	4.12·10^{−5} atm m^{3} / mol

Hazards
- GHS labelling
Pictograms	(GHS08: Health hazard) (GHS07: Exclamation mark) (GHS09: Environmental hazard)
Signal word	Warning
Hazard statements	H227, H315, H319, H373, H411
Precautionary statements	P210, P260, P264, P273, P280, P302+P352, P305+P351+P338, P314, P332+P313, P337+P313, P362, P370+P378, P391, P403+P235, P501
Flash point	80°C

Related compounds
Related compounds	Isononyl alcohol
- Except where otherwise noted, data are given for materials in their standard state (at 25 °C [77 °F], 100 kPa). Infobox references

3,5,5-Trimethyl-1-hexanol is a nine carbon primary alcohol, and it makes up the mixture isononanol along with isononyl alcohol. It is used for fragrance in many toiletries and household cleaning products. Between one and ten metric tonnes are produced every year for use as a fragrance.
