= Theacrine =

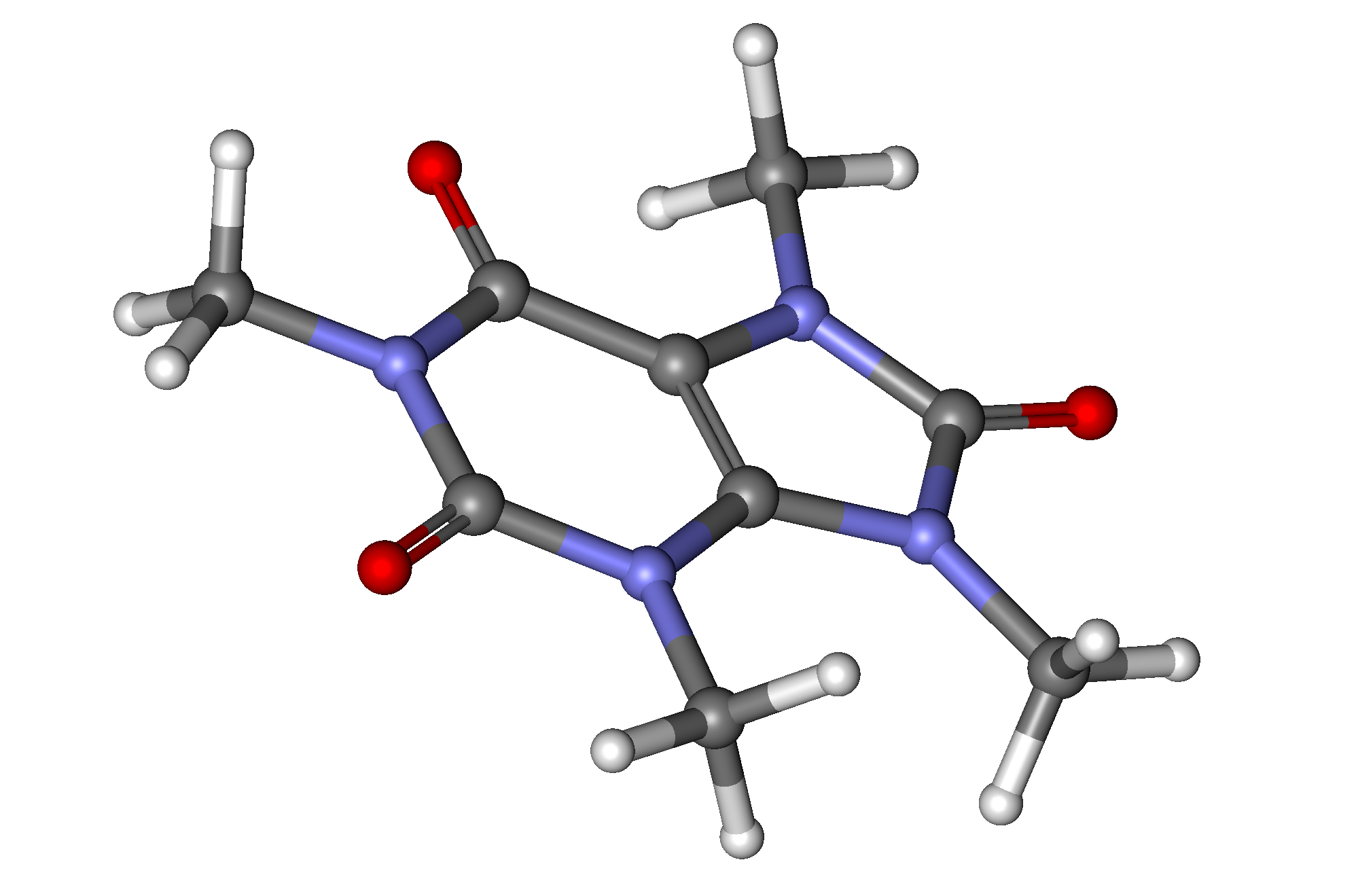

Names
- Preferred IUPAC name 1,3,7,9-Tetramethyl-7,9-dihydro-1H-purine-2,6,8(3H)-trione
- Other names 1,3,7,9-Tetramethyluric acid; Temurin; Temorine; Tetramethyluric acid; Tetramethyl uric acid; TeaCrine (trade name)

Identifiers
CAS Number	2309-49-1
3D model (JSmol)	Interactive image
ChEBI	CHEBI:139388
ChemSpider	67862
ECHA InfoCard	100.017.268
PubChem CID	75324
UNII	EJ939L81MY
CompTox Dashboard (EPA)	DTXSID90177659
- InChI: InChI=1S/C9H12N4O3/c1-10-5-6(11(2)8(10)15)12(3)9(16)13(4)7(5)14/h1-4H3 Key: QGDOQULISIQFHQ-UHFFFAOYSA-N; InChI=1/C9H12N4O3/c1-10-5-6(11(2)8(10)15)12(3)9(16)13(4)7(5)14/h1-4H3 Key: QGDOQULISIQFHQ-UHFFFAOYAN
- SMILES: CN1C2=C(N(C1=O)C)N(C(=O)N(C2=O)C)C

Properties
Chemical formula	C_{9}H_{12}N_{4}O_{3}
Molar mass	224.220 g·mol^{−1}
Melting point	226 °C (439 °F; 499 K)
- Except where otherwise noted, data are given for materials in their standard state (at 25 °C [77 °F], 100 kPa). Infobox references

Theacrine, also known as 1,3,7,9-tetramethyluric acid, is a purine alkaloid found in cupuaçu (Theobroma grandiflorum), in a Chinese variety of tea called kucha (Chinese: 苦茶; pinyin: kǔ chá; lit. 'bitter tea') (Camellia assamica var. kucha), and in stenophylla coffee. It shows anti-inflammatory and analgesic effects and appears to affect adenosine signalling in a manner similar to caffeine. In kucha leaves, theacrine is synthesized from caffeine in what is thought to be a three-step pathway. Theacrine and caffeine are structurally similar.

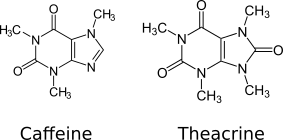

== Pharmacology ==
=== Pharmacodynamics ===
The exact mechanism of action of theacrine is uncertain, as no binding affinities have been published. However, animal research involving selective A1 and A2A adenosine agonists found theacrine pretreatment attenuated the expected motor depression induced by adenosine agonism, indicating that theacrine is likely an adenosine antagonist.

Administration of selective dopamine D1 and D2 antagonists demonstrate that, similarly to caffeine, the behavioural effects of theacrine are in part mediated by dopamine receptors.

=== Pharmacokinetics ===
Theacrine has half-life of 30 to 33 hours.

== Safety ==
Theacrine has demonstrated clinical safety and non-habituating effects in healthy humans over eight weeks of daily use at up to 300 mg/day. Moreover, there was no evidence of the tachyphylaxis typical of neuroactive agents like caffeine and other stimulants.

In animal studies, theacrine has an LD_{50} of 810 mg/kg, compared to 265 mg/kg for caffeine.

== See also ==
- Liberine
- Methylliberine
- Theobromine
- Theophylline
