= 3-Methyl-3-octanol =

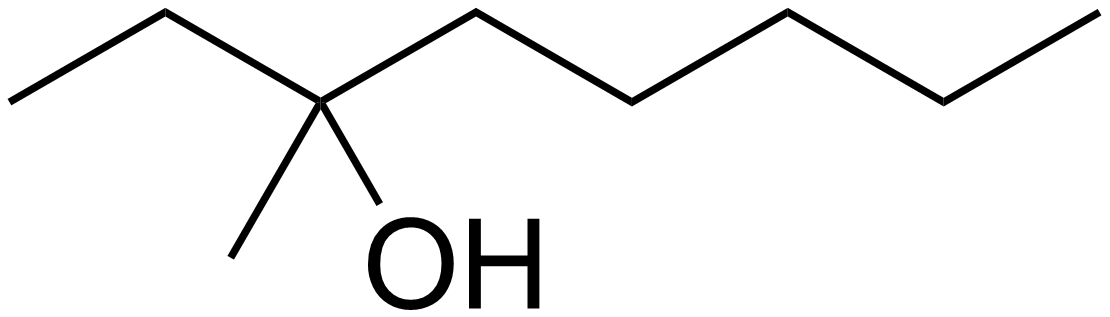

Names
- Preferred IUPAC name 3-Methyloctan-3-ol
- Other names Amylethylmethylcarbinol; 2-Ethyl-2-heptanol; 3-Methyloctan-3-ol

Identifiers
CAS Number	5340-36-3
3D model (JSmol)	Interactive image; Interactive image
ChemSpider	20143
ECHA InfoCard	100.023.888
PubChem CID	21432
UNII	519R9981PM
CompTox Dashboard (EPA)	DTXSID80884148
- InChI: InChI=1S/C9H20O/c1-4-6-7-8-9(3,10)5-2/h10H,4-8H2,1-3H3 Key: JEWXYDDSLPIBBO-UHFFFAOYSA-N; InChI=1S/C9H20O/c1-4-6-7-8-9(3,10)5-2/h10H,4-8H2,1-3H3 Key: JEWXYDDSLPIBBO-UHFFFAOYSA-N; InChI=1/C9H20O/c1-4-6-7-8-9(3,10)5-2/h10H,4-8H2,1-3H3 Key: JEWXYDDSLPIBBO-UHFFFAOYAT
- SMILES: CCCCCC(C)(CC)O; OC(CC)(CCCCC)C

Properties
Chemical formula	C_{9}H_{20}O
Molar mass	144.2545 g/mol
Density	0.822 g/mL
Boiling point	127 °C (261 °F; 400 K)

Hazards
Flash point	73 °C (163 °F; 346 K)
- Except where otherwise noted, data are given for materials in their standard state (at 25 °C [77 °F], 100 kPa). verify (what is ?) Infobox references

3-Methyl-3-octanol (systematically named 3-methyloctan-3-ol) is an organic compound with the chemical formula CH_{3}(CH_{2})_{4}C(CH_{3})(CH_{2}CH_{3})OH (also written as C_{9}H_{20}O). This simple tertiary alcohol is a clear colourless liquid under standard conditions, and is tasteless.

It is used in the food industry as a flavouring agent as it contributes to the flavour of roast beef. It is known to be biochemically produced by the Antrodia camphorata fungus. 3-Methyl-3-octanol is a chiral compound, with each isomer yielding a different flavour.
