= 1,3,7-Trimethyluric acid =

Names
- Preferred IUPAC name 1,3,7-Trimethyl-7,9-dihydro-1H-purine-2,6,8(3H)-trione
- Other names 8-Oxy-caffeine

Identifiers
CAS Number	5415-44-1
3D model (JSmol)	Interactive image
ChEBI	CHEBI:691622
ChEMBL	ChEMBLCHEMBL1767
ChemSpider	71754
ECHA InfoCard	100.024.098
KEGG	C16361
PubChem CID	79437
UNII	Z61UN6MHB7
CompTox Dashboard (EPA)	DTXSID50202496
- InChI: InChI=1S/C8H10N4O3/c1-10-4-5(9-7(10)14)11(2)8(15)12(3)6(4)13/h1-3H3,(H,9,14) Key: BYXCFUMGEBZDDI-UHFFFAOYSA-N
- SMILES: CN1C2=C(NC1=O)N(C(=O)N(C2=O)C)C

Properties
Chemical formula	C_{8}H_{10}N_{4}O_{3}
Molar mass	210.192
Appearance	White, crystalline
Melting point	≥ 300 °C (572 °F; 573 K)
- Except where otherwise noted, data are given for materials in their standard state (at 25 °C [77 °F], 100 kPa). Infobox references

1,3,7-Trimethyluric acid, also referred to as trimethyluric acid and 8-oxy-caffeine, is a purine alkaloid that is produced in some plants and occurs as a minor metabolite of caffeine in humans. The enzymes that metabolize caffeine into 1,3,7-trimethyluric acid in humans include CYP1A2, CYP2E1, CYP2C8, CYP2C9, and CYP3A4.
