= 2-Nonanol =

Names
- Preferred IUPAC name Nonan-2-ol

Identifiers
CAS Number	628-99-9
3D model (JSmol)	Interactive image
ChEBI	CHEBI:78304
ChEMBL	ChEMBL454517
ChemSpider	11861
ECHA InfoCard	100.010.060
PubChem CID	12367
UNII	292T5234DX
CompTox Dashboard (EPA)	DTXSID60862323
- InChI: InChI=1S/C9H20O/c1-3-4-5-6-7-8-9(2)10/h9-10H,3-8H2,1-2H3 Key: NGDNVOAEIVQRFH-UHFFFAOYSA-N; InChI=1/C9H20O/c1-3-4-5-6-7-8-9(2)10/h9-10H,3-8H2,1-2H3 Key: NGDNVOAEIVQRFH-UHFFFAOYAZ
- SMILES: OC(CCCCCCC)C

Properties
Chemical formula	C_{9}H_{20}O
Molar mass	144.2545
Density	0.827 g/mL
Melting point	−36 – −35 °C (−33 – −31 °F; 237–238 K)
Boiling point	193–194 °C (379–381 °F; 466–467 K)
- Except where otherwise noted, data are given for materials in their standard state (at 25 °C [77 °F], 100 kPa). verify (what is ?) Infobox references

2-Nonanol is a simple alcohol. It has the odor of cucumber, and has been identified in oysters. It is used by several insects as pheromones. It is commercially available.
