= Cis-3-Methyl-4-octanolide =

cis-3-Methyl-4-octanolide
- (3R,4R)-isomer

- (3S,4S)-isomer

Names
- Preferred IUPAC name rel-(4R,5R)-5-Butyl-4-methyloxolan-2-one
- Other names Whisky lactone; Quercus lactone; cis-β-Methyl-γ-octalactone

Identifiers
| CAS Number | 39212-23-2 (racemate); 80041-00-5 (3S,4S); 55013-32-6 (3R,4R) |
| 3D model (JSmol) | (3R,4R): Interactive image; (3S,4S): Interactive image |
| ChemSpider | 37679 (3R,4R); 9270013 (3S,4S) |
| PubChem CID | 41285 (3R,4R); 11094871 (3S,4S) |
| UNII | HKX8Y5BUAO (racemate); DR7KRE2AJV (3S,4S); O93PZ85MTG (3R,4R) |
- InChI: InChI=1S/C9H16O2/c1-3-4-5-8-7(2)6-9(10)11-8/h7-8H,3-6H2,1-2H3/t7-,8-/m1/s1; (3S,4S): InChI=1S/C9H16O2/c1-3-4-5-8-7(2)6-9(10)11-8/h7-8H,3-6H2,1-2H3/t7-,8-/m0/s1
- SMILES: (3R,4R): O=C1O[C@H](CCCC)[C@@H](C1)C; (3S,4S): CCCC[C@@H]1OC(=O)C[C@@H]1C

Properties
| Chemical formula | C_{9}H_{16}O_{2} |
| Molar mass | 156.225 g·mol^{−1} |
- Except where otherwise noted, data are given for materials in their standard state (at 25 °C [77 °F], 100 kPa). Infobox references

cis-3-Methyl-4-octanolide, also called cis-β-methyl-γ-octalactone or 5-butyldihydro-4-methylfuran-2(3H)-one, is a chemical compound of the lactone family with formula C_{9}H_{16}O_{2}. It exists in two optical isomers: 3R,4R ("+") and 3S,4S ("−").

The 3S,4S isomer, commonly known as whisky lactone or quercus lactone is an important ingredient in the aroma of whiskey (where it was first identified by Suomalainen and Nykänen in 1970) and other alcoholic beverages that have been aged in oak barrels. It is sometimes added to the liquor as a flavoring agent. It has a coconut, celery or fresh wood aroma, that can be detected by humans at the concentration of 1 μg/L in air. A mixture of the cis and trans isomers is repellent for mosquitos and flies.

The 3S,4S isomer is extracted by the alcoholic beverage from some precursor substances in the oak wood. It can be synthesized from a cyclopentane derivative.

== See also ==
- trans-3-Methyl-4-octanolide, a stereoisomer also found in oak-aged beverages.

3-Methyl-4-octanolide, cis and trans isomers.
