= Methylliberine =

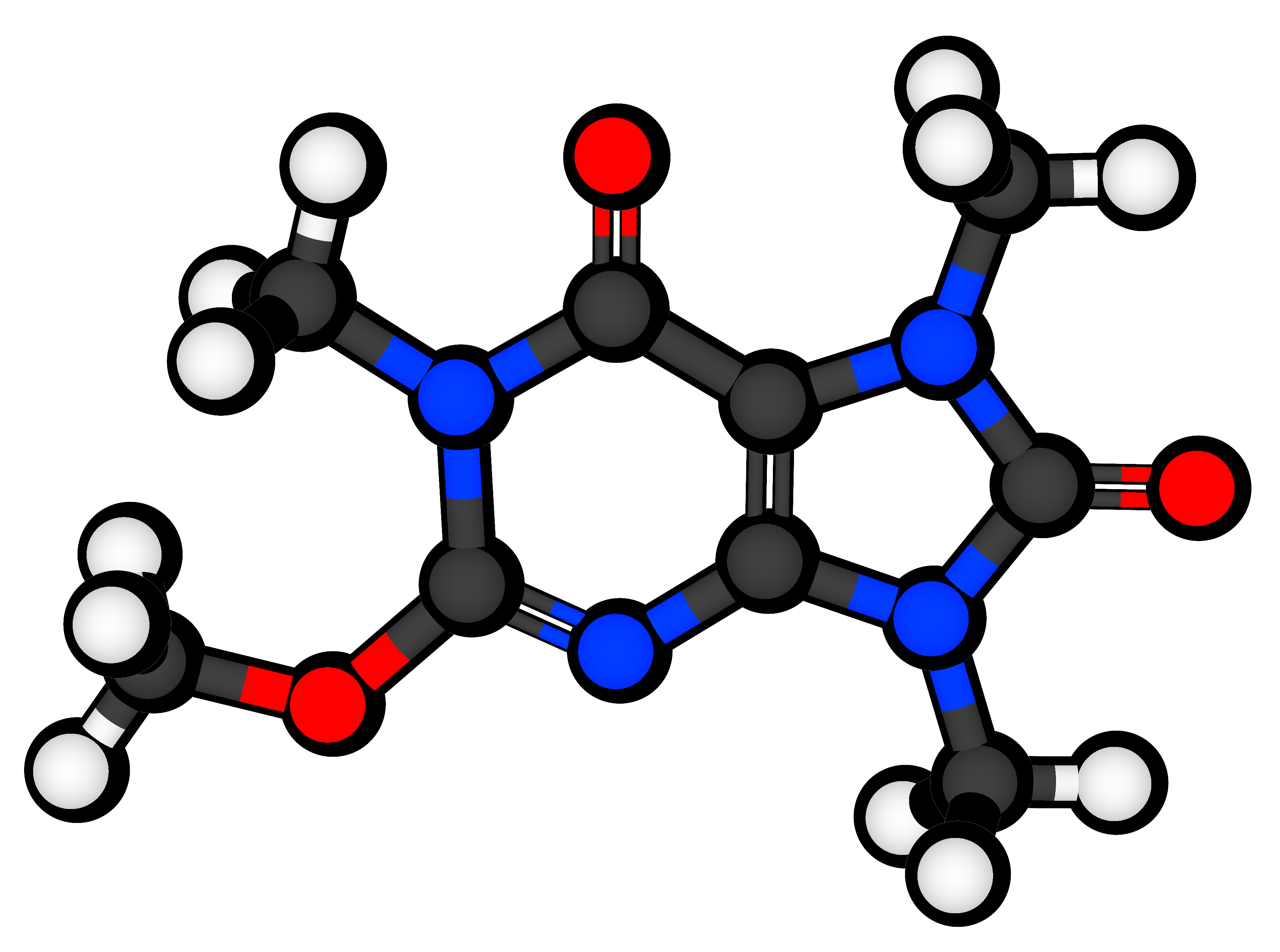

Names
- Preferred IUPAC name 2-Methoxy-1,7,9-trimethyl-7,9-dihydro-1H-purine-6,8-dione
- Other names O(2),1,7,9-Tetramethylurate; Tetramethyluric acid; Dynamine

Identifiers
CAS Number	51168-26-4
3D model (JSmol)	Interactive image
ChemSpider	43515875
PubChem CID	15872156
UNII	RY9AJC5PA7
CompTox Dashboard (EPA)	DTXSID401045665
- InChI: InChI=1S/C9H12N4O3/c1-11-5-6(12(2)9(11)15)10-8(16-4)13(3)7(5)14/h1-4H3 Key: ZVQXCXPGLSBNCX-UHFFFAOYSA-N; InChI=1/C9H12N4O3/c1-11-5-6(12(2)9(11)15)10-8(16-4)13(3)7(5)14/h1-4H3 Key: ZVQXCXPGLSBNCX-UHFFFAOYAY
- SMILES: CN1C2=C(N=C(N(C2=O)C)OC)N(C1=O)C

Properties
Chemical formula	C_{9}H_{12}N_{4}O_{3}
Molar mass	224.220 g·mol^{−1}
- Except where otherwise noted, data are given for materials in their standard state (at 25 °C [77 °F], 100 kPa). Infobox references

Methylliberine is an isolate of coffee beans, tea, cola nuts, guarana, cocoa, and yerba mate. It is structurally related to Liberine.

== Pharmacology ==
=== Pharmacodynamics ===
Based on its structural similarity to caffeine and theacrine, methylliberine is widely believed to be an adenosine receptor antagonist, although as of 2023 no scientific studies have been done to confirm this action. There is no evidence that methylliberine augments dopamine receptors in a way that is distinct from caffeine, contrary to claims made by the manufacturer.

=== Pharmacokinetics ===
Methylliberine has a short half-life of only 1.5 hours compared to the 5- to 7-hour half-life of caffeine. An interaction study showed concomitant administration of both caffeine and methylliberine increases the half-life of caffeine by about 2 fold. This is likely due to inhibition of the CYP1A2 enzyme.
