= Liberine =

Names
- Preferred IUPAC name 2-Methoxy-1,9-dimethyl-7,9-dihydro-1H-purine-6,8-dione
- Other names O(2),1,9-Trimethylurate; Trimethyluric acid

Identifiers
CAS Number	56119-16-5
3D model (JSmol)	Interactive image
ChemSpider	48060240
PubChem CID	46926249
UNII	9W7FN2S6JX
CompTox Dashboard (EPA)	DTXSID301045662
- InChI: InChI=1S/C8H10N4O3/c1-11-5-4(9-7(11)14)6(13)12(2)8(10-5)15-3/h1-3H3,(H,9,14) Key: IDVFNSHOEYLXJD-UHFFFAOYSA-N; InChI=1/C8H10N4O3/c1-11-5-4(9-7(11)14)6(13)12(2)8(10-5)15-3/h1-3H3,(H,9,14) Key: IDVFNSHOEYLXJD-UHFFFAOYAU
- SMILES: CN1C2=C(C(=O)N(C(=N2)OC)C)NC1=O

Properties
Chemical formula	C_{8}H_{10}N_{4}O_{3}
Molar mass	210.193 g·mol^{−1}
- Except where otherwise noted, data are given for materials in their standard state (at 25 °C [77 °F], 100 kPa). Infobox references

Liberine, also referred to as O(2),1,9-trimethyluric acid, is a purine alkaloid. It is an isolate of coffee beans, tea, kola nuts, guarana, cocoa beans and yerba mate.

== See also ==
- Methylliberine - with an additional N-methyl group on the imidazolidine
