= Isononyl alcohol =

Names
- IUPAC name 7-methyloctan-1-ol

Identifiers
CAS Number	2430-22-0
3D model (JSmol)	Interactive image
Beilstein Reference	4-01-00-01806
ChEBI	CHEBI:188348
ChemSpider	16158
EC Number	248-471-3
MeSH	alcohol isononyl alcohol
PubChem CID	17072
UNII	KY36Z95MC2
CompTox Dashboard (EPA)	DTXSID2058675
- InChI: InChI=1S/C9H20O/c1-9(2)7-5-3-4-6-8-10/h9-10H,3-8H2,1-2H3 Key: QDTDKYHPHANITQ-UHFFFAOYSA-N
- SMILES: CC(C)CCCCCCO

Properties
Chemical formula	C_{9}H_{20}O
Molar mass	144.258 g·mol^{−1}
Appearance	Clear liquid
Density	0.83 g/cm^{3}
Boiling point	215 °C
Solubility in water	Slightly soluble
Vapor pressure	0.0198 mm Hg
Henry's law constant (k_{H})	0.0000412 atm m^{3}/mol

Hazards
- GHS labelling
Pictograms	(GHS05: Corrosive) (GHS07: Exclamation mark)
Signal word	Warning
Hazard statements	H315, H318, H319, H412
Precautionary statements	P264, P264+P265, P273, P280, P302+P352, P305+P351+P338, P305+P354+P338, P317, P321, P332+P317, P337+P317, P362+P364, P501
NFPA 704 (fire diamond)	1 2 0
Flash point	98 °C

Related compounds
Related compounds	3,5,5-Trimethyl-1-hexanol
- Except where otherwise noted, data are given for materials in their standard state (at 25 °C [77 °F], 100 kPa). Infobox references

Isononyl alcohol (INA) is a nine carbon primary alcohol. It is used in small amounts as fragrance in soap, hair spray, face creams, and shampoo. INA, along with 3,5,5-Trimethyl-1-hexanol, makes up the mixture sometimes referred to as isononanol.

Nonyl alcohols, including isononyl alcohol, are typically produced by hydroformylation of octenes. Isomeric octenes are produced by dimerization of butenes. These alcohol mixtures are used as solvents in paints and as precursors to plasticizers.
