= Ataman A092 =

Ukrainian bus model

Bogdan/Ataman A092
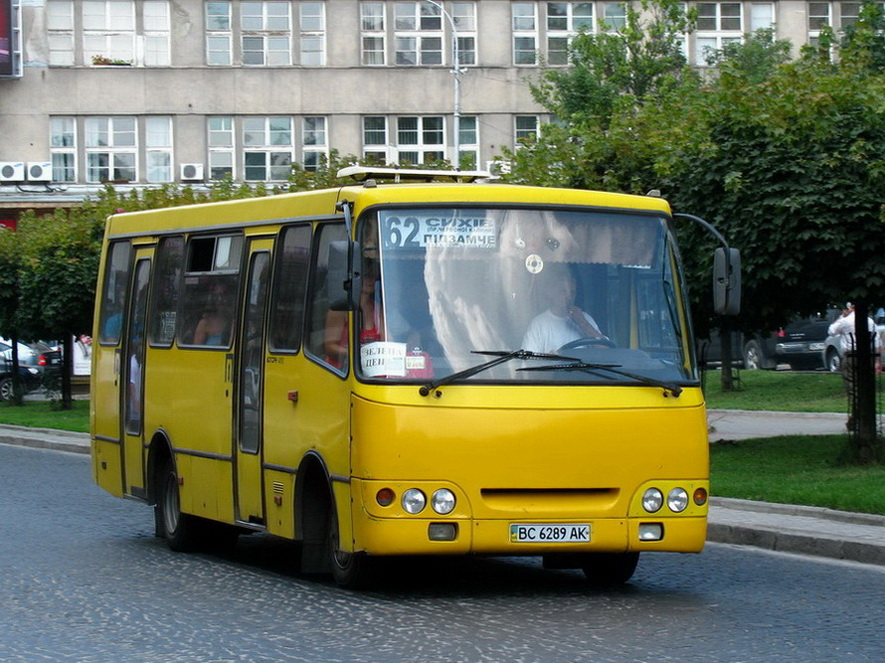
- Bogdan A092 in Lviv

Overview
- Manufacturer: Bogdan (2003–2011); Isuzu Ataman (2012–present)
- Also called: Radzimich A092 (Belarus)
- Production: Bogdan A092: 2003–2012; Ataman A092: 2012–2015; Ataman D093: 2016–present
- Assembly: Cherkasy, Ukraine (Isuzu Ataman); Lutsk, Ukraine (Bogdan ASZ No. 1); Gomel, Belarus (GARZ)
- Designer: UkrAutobusProm

Body and chassis
- Class: midibus
- Doors: 2
- Floor type: high-floor
- Chassis: Isuzu NQR71P

Powertrain
- Engine: Isuzu 4HG1-T; Isuzu 4HK1-XS
- Transmission: Isuzu MYY5T; Isuzu MZZ6U

Dimensions
- Wheelbase: 3,815 mm (150.2 in)
- Length: 7,430 mm (292.5 in); 7,730 mm (304.3 in)
- Width: 2,380 mm (93.7 in)
- Height: 2,740 mm (107.9 in)
- Curb weight: 5,000 kg (11,023 lb)

Chronology
- Predecessor: Bogdan A091
- Successor: Bogdan A201

The Ataman A092, known as Bogdan A092 in 2003–2011 and as Cherkasy Autobus A092 in 2011–2012, is a high-floor midibus manufactured at Isuzu Ataman factory (former Cherkasy Autobus) in Ukraine.

== History ==
Bogdan's Cherkasy Autobus had been producing their successful Bogdan A091 midibus since 1999, but with time it has been becoming increasingly irrelevant in terms of ecological and safety standards so the company decided to design an updated model reflecting on the feedback of bus drivers and passengers. The new Bogdan A092 was presented February 11, 2003, aside from the new mask design it received a new headlights and taillights, larger driver's windows, new doors and seats, traction control system and a Euro-3 engine, the bus also became 215 mm longer.

Bogdan Motors began to export their A092 to Russia, Armenia and Georgia. In 2005–2013 they were also assembled at Gomel Automobile Repair Factory in Belarus under the name Radzimich A092.

When Bogdan Corporation was formed in 2005 it was decided to move all the bus production to Lutsk Automobile Factory so Cherkasy plant would only assemble licensed foreign cars but the 2008 crisis caused a big credit load on the corporation.

At TIR-2010 motor show Bogdan presented their new A093 model. It was an A092 stretched to 821 m equipped with new lights. City version could transport 50 people, while intercity one had place for 36 passengers.

In 2011 Bogdan decides to sell the Cherkasy Autobus factory to Prominvestbank due to financial struggles dating back to 2008 crisis. The factory had extended their partnership with Isuzu and formed the Isuzu Ataman, renaming their A092 lineup to Ataman.

In 2012 alongside the renaming Ataman A092 had received a restyling with various minor improvements. Some of the variations also received glued windows similar to the ones installed on the early A091 buses. The bus was remaining in production until 2015, next year Cherkasy Autobus Factory presented its replacement, Ataman A092H6.

After the discontinuation of citybus models A093 had been redesigned into a school bus and renamed to D093S with several modifications allowing wheelchairs. Putting these models into production in 2016 Ataman began its participance in a state-ran school bus program that was meant to provide transport for the schools in small towns and villages.

Another modification was unveiled in 2020. The new Ataman DA9016 was very similar to D093S but had a four wheel drive and a safety belts on the passenger seats.

== Modifications ==
- Bogdan A09201, A09202, A09204 and A09206 – city buses with automatic doors
- Bogdan A09211, A09212 and A09214 – intercity buses with one automatic door and one hand-opening door
- Ataman A092H1, A092H4 and A092G6 – city buses with automatic doors and a wider rear entrance
- Ataman A092G6, A092G7, A092G8 and A092G9 – intercity buses with hand-opening doors
- Bogdan A092S4 – school bus with one automatic door and one hand-opening door
- Bogdan A09302, A09304 and A09306 – longer variations with automatic doors
- Bogdan A09312, A09314 and A09316 – longer variations with one automatic door and one hand-opening door
- Ataman A093H2, A093H4 and A093H6 – longer variations with automatic doors and a wider rear entrance
- Bogdan A081 – Dongfeng chassis variation
- Ataman D093S2 – school bus with one automatic door and one hand-opening door
- Ataman D093S4 – school bus with one automatic door, one hand-opening door and a wider rear entrance
- Ataman D093S201 – 4x4 school bus with one automatic door, one hand-opening door and a wider rear entrance
- Ataman DA9016 – 4x4 intercity bus with one automatic door and one hand-opening door

== Gallery ==
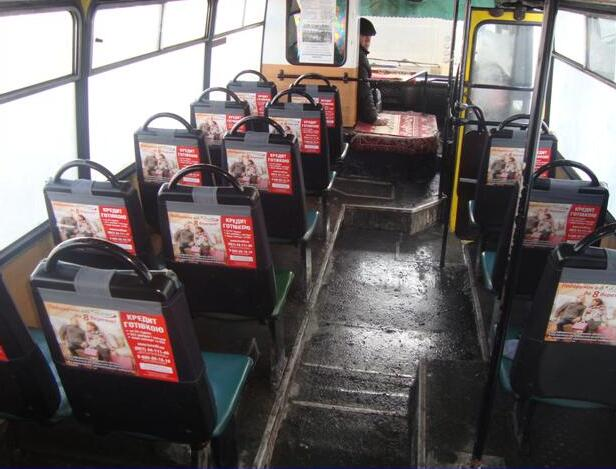
Interior

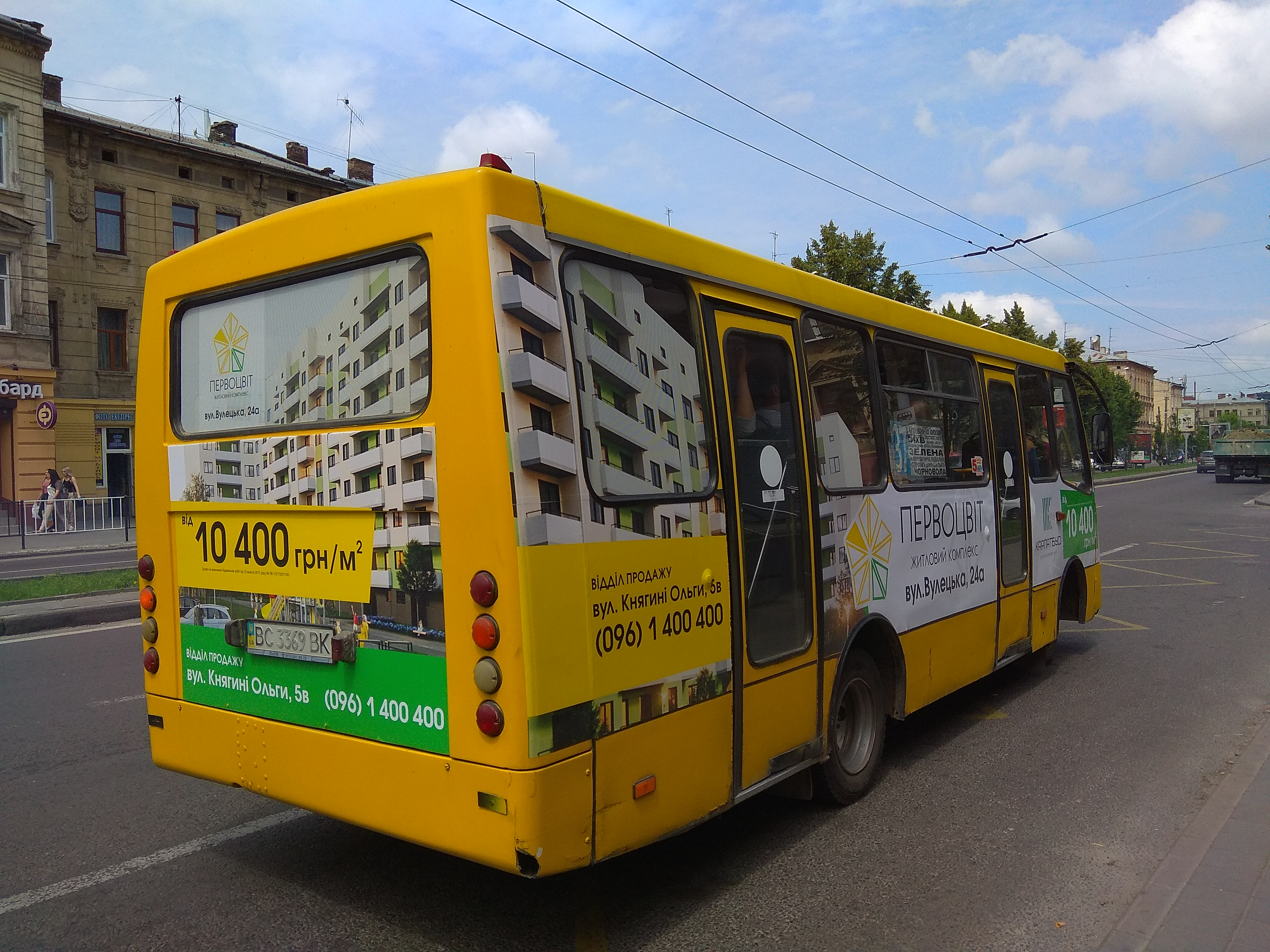
Rear view

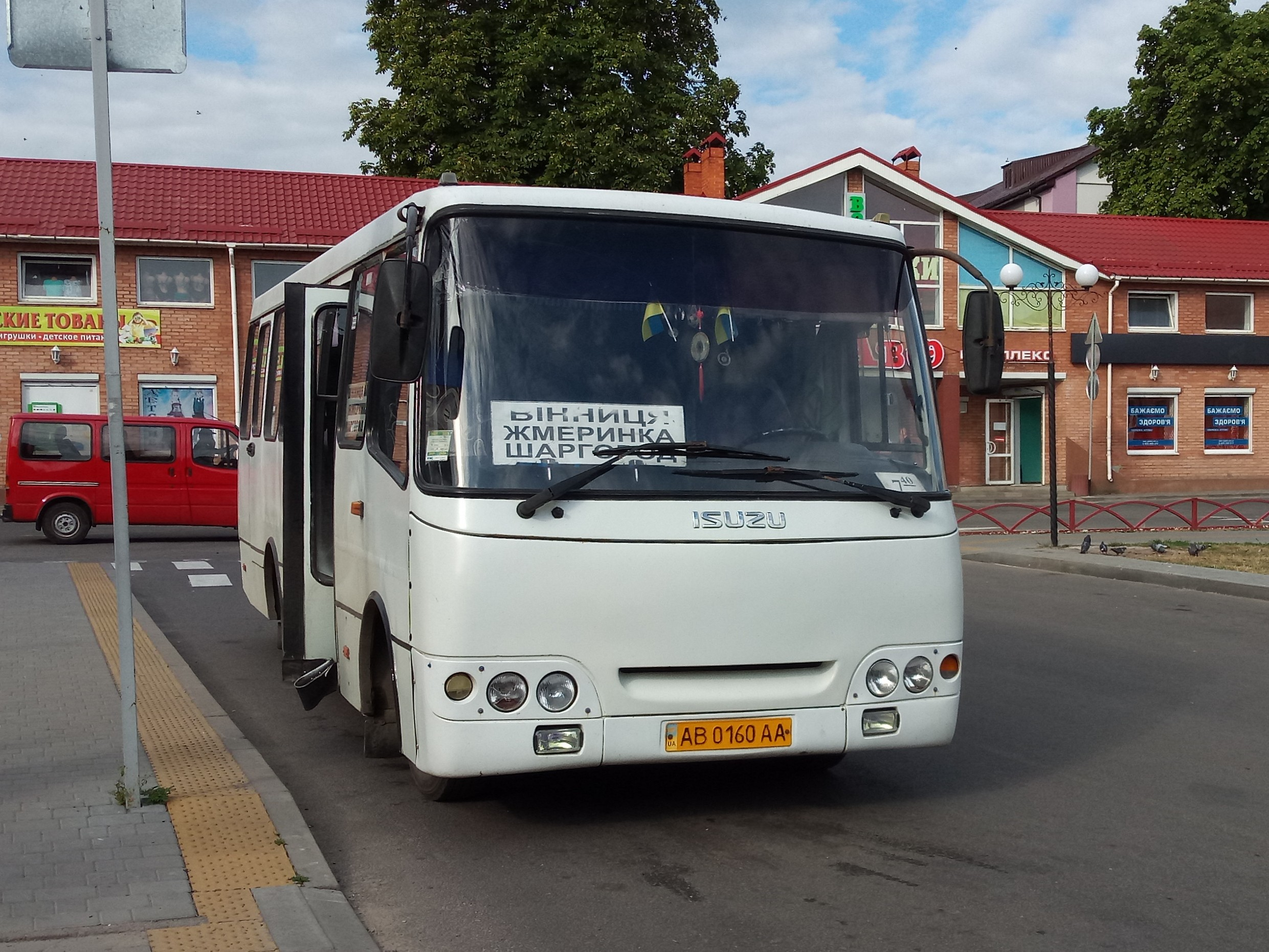
Bogdan A09212

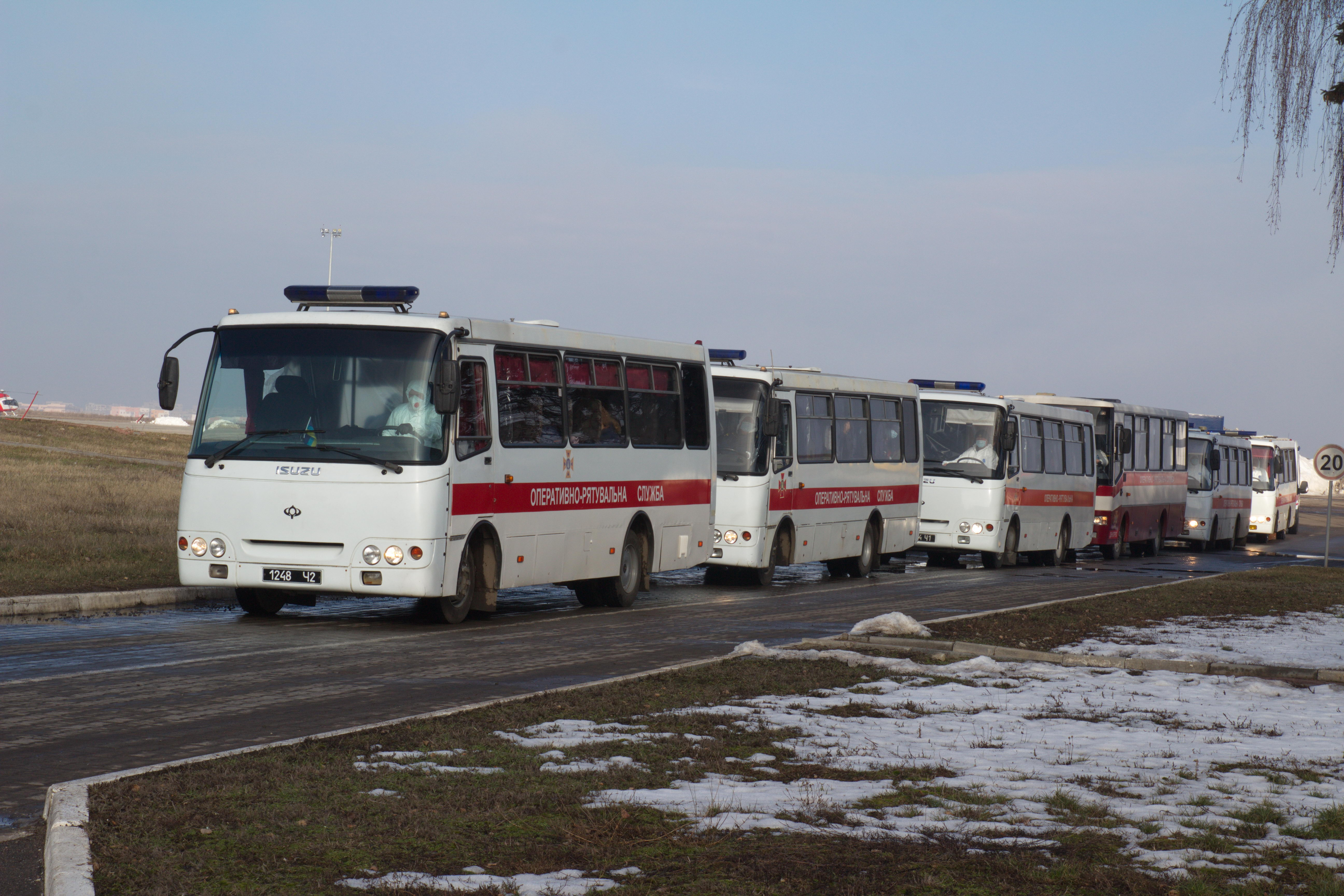
Bogdan A092 used by DSNS

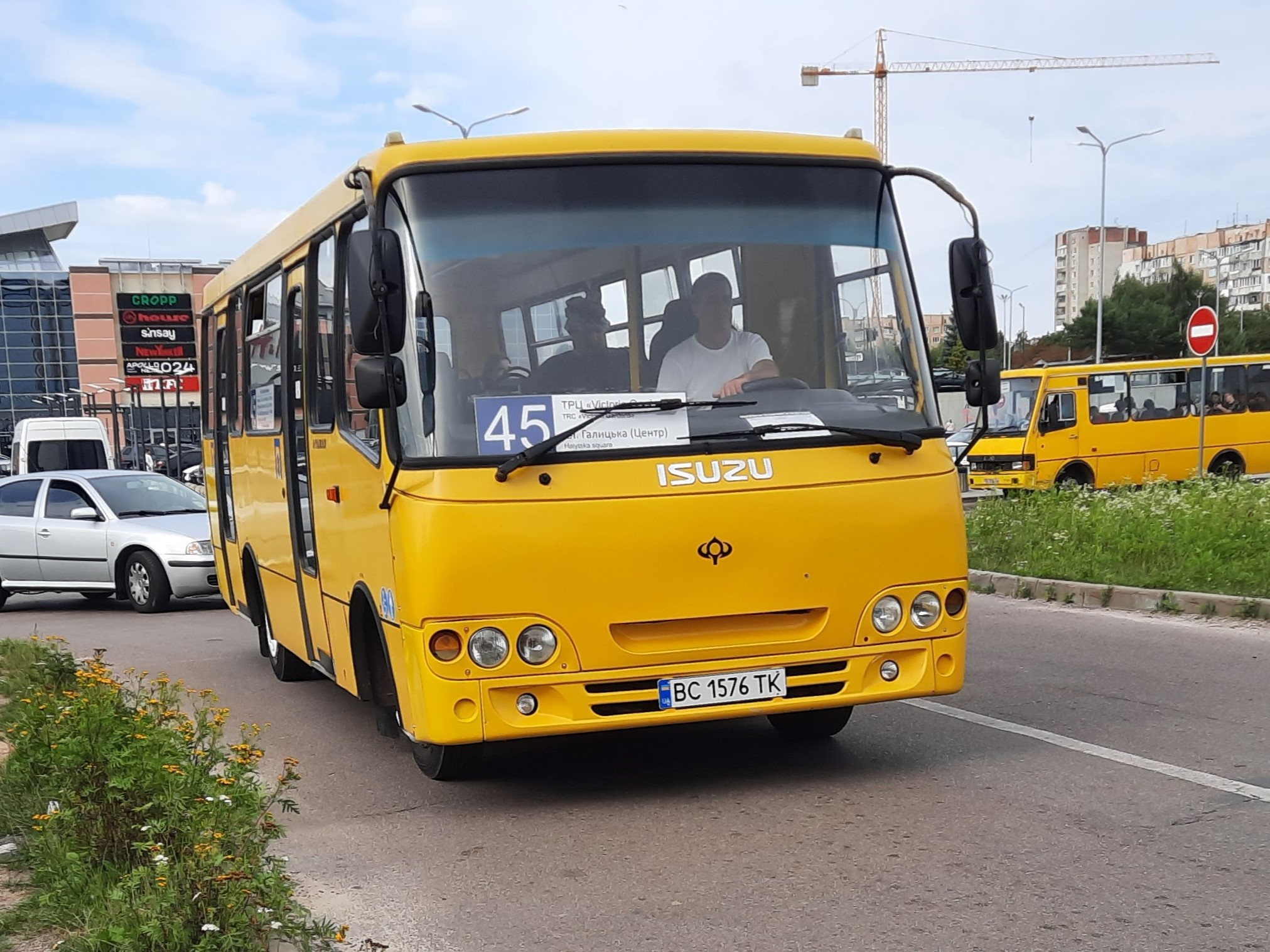
Facelifted Ataman A092

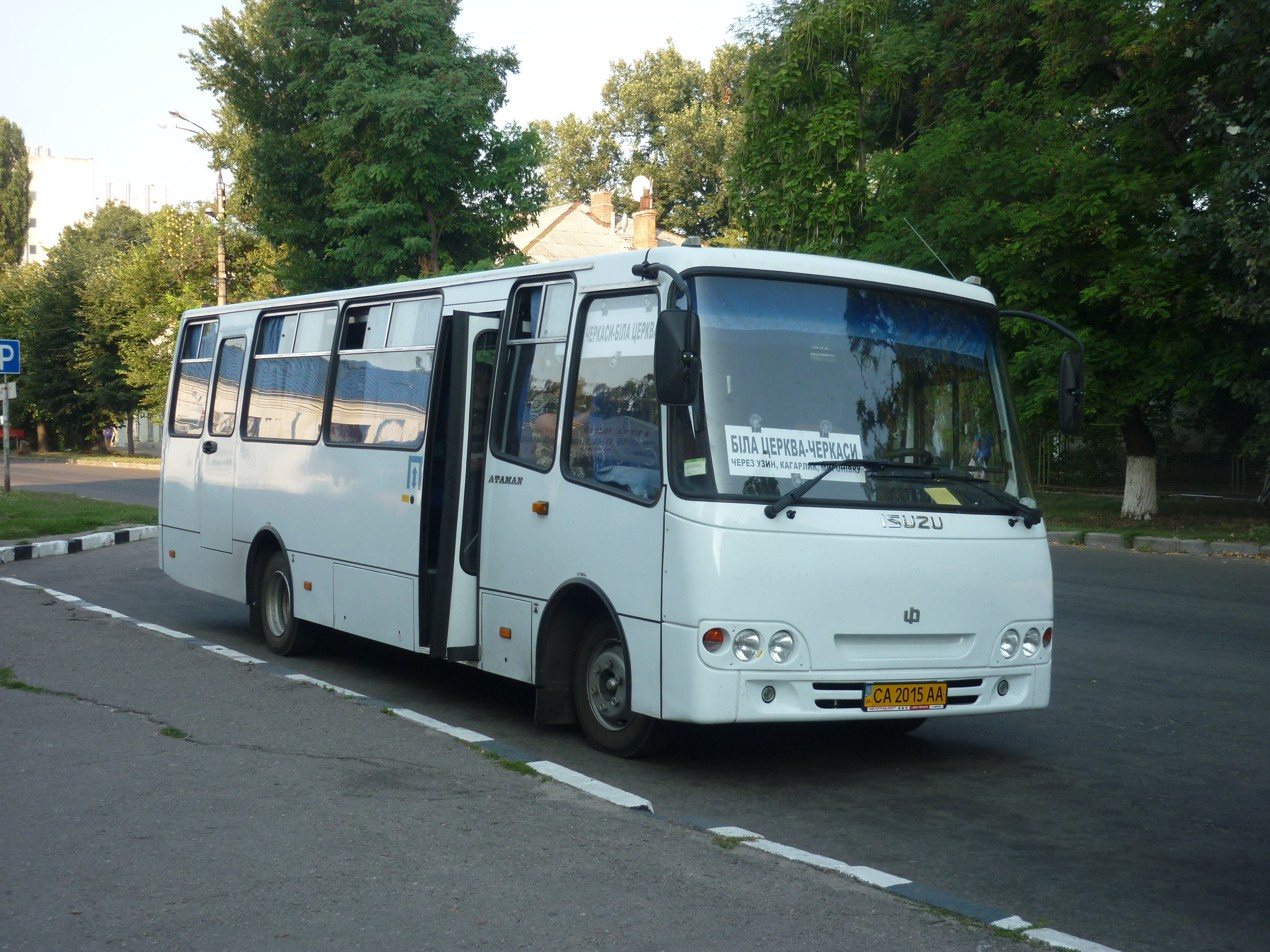
Facelifted Ataman A09314

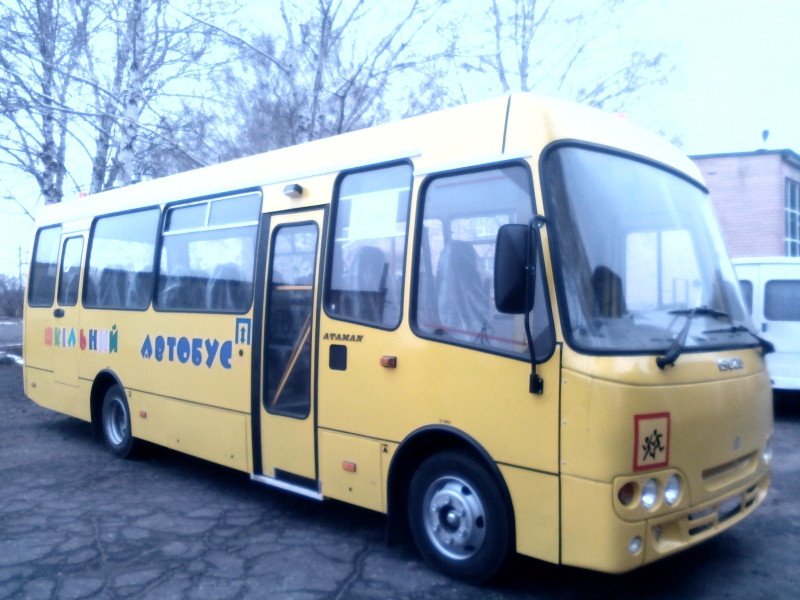
Ataman D093S2

== Ataman A092H6 ==
Ataman A092H6
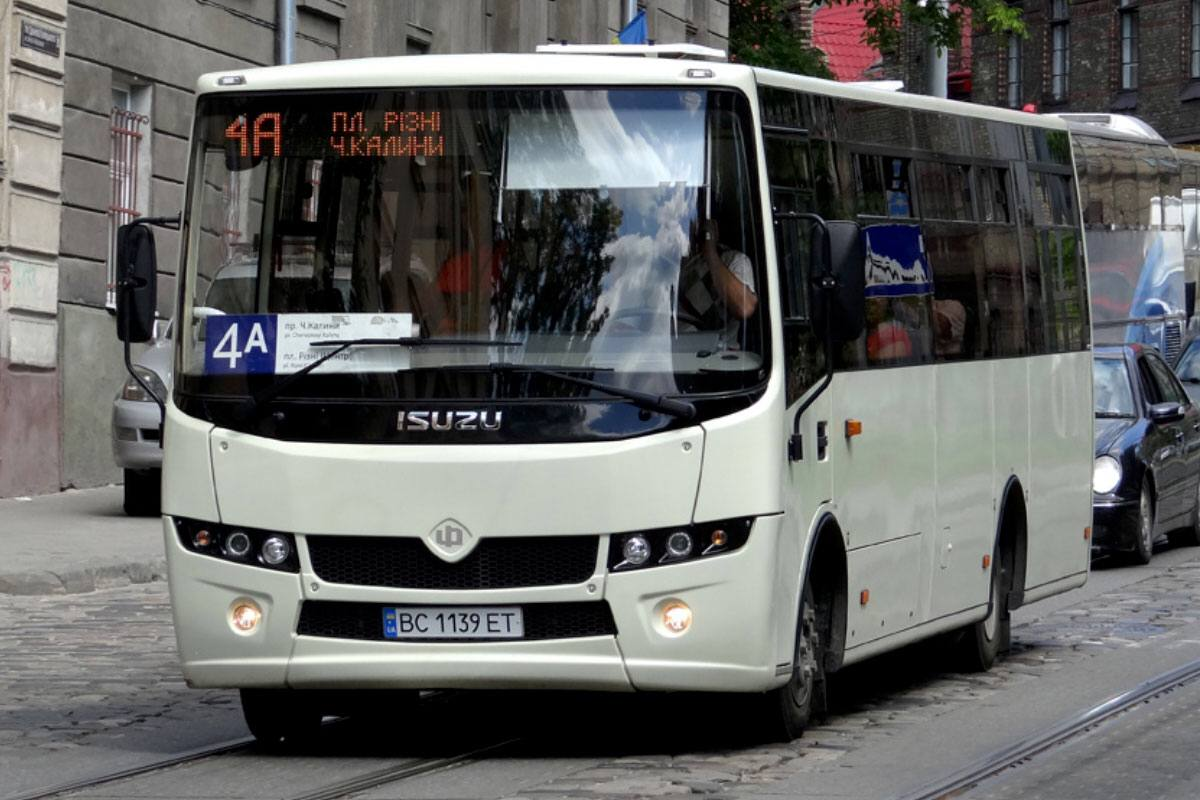
- Ataman A092H6 in Lviv

Overview
- Manufacturer: Isuzu Ataman
- Production: 2016–present
- Assembly: Cherkasy, Ukraine (Isuzu Ataman)

Body and chassis
- Class: midibus
- Doors: 2
- Floor type: high-floor
- Chassis: Isuzu NQR71P

Powertrain
- Engine: Isuzu 4HK1-Е5NC
- Transmission: Isuzu MYY6S

Dimensions
- Wheelbase: 4,395 mm (173.0 in)
- Length: 8,220 mm (323.6 in)
- Width: 2,320 mm (91.3 in)
- Height: 2,700 mm (106.3 in)
- Curb weight: 5,240 kg (11,552 lb)

After producing their very successful A092 bus for over a decade Isuzu Ataman decided to develop its replacement in order to stay up-to-date with a modern safety standards and Euro-5 ecological regulations. February 6, 2016 the company presented the Ataman A092H6, its design was updated to match their recently launched Ataman A096 tour bus. The H letter in the name was referring to the modification of the previous A092 which had a wider rear entrance for disabled people. The new bus had two wider entrances and the doors were now opening to the outside instead of the inside like its predecessors, there was also a place for a wheelchair inside. Also A092H6 featured an electric informer board to display the bus route number and final stops.

Next year Ataman presented the intercity variation of the bus. It had one automatic and one hand-opening door as well as luggage compartment. After the testing it was put in serial production.

Also Ataman A092G6 was introduced, it had a CNG engine with ballons installed on the roof.

In 2018 forty A092H6 buses had been exported to Georgian city of Batumi.

After Russian invasion of Ukraine in February 2022 the production has been temporarily stopped, the deliveries only resumed in August that year.

=== Modifications ===
- Ataman A092H6 – city bus with automatic doors
- Ataman A092G6 – city bus with automatic doors and a CNG engine.
- Ataman A09216 and D09216 – intercity variations with one automatic door and one hand-opening door

=== Gallery ===
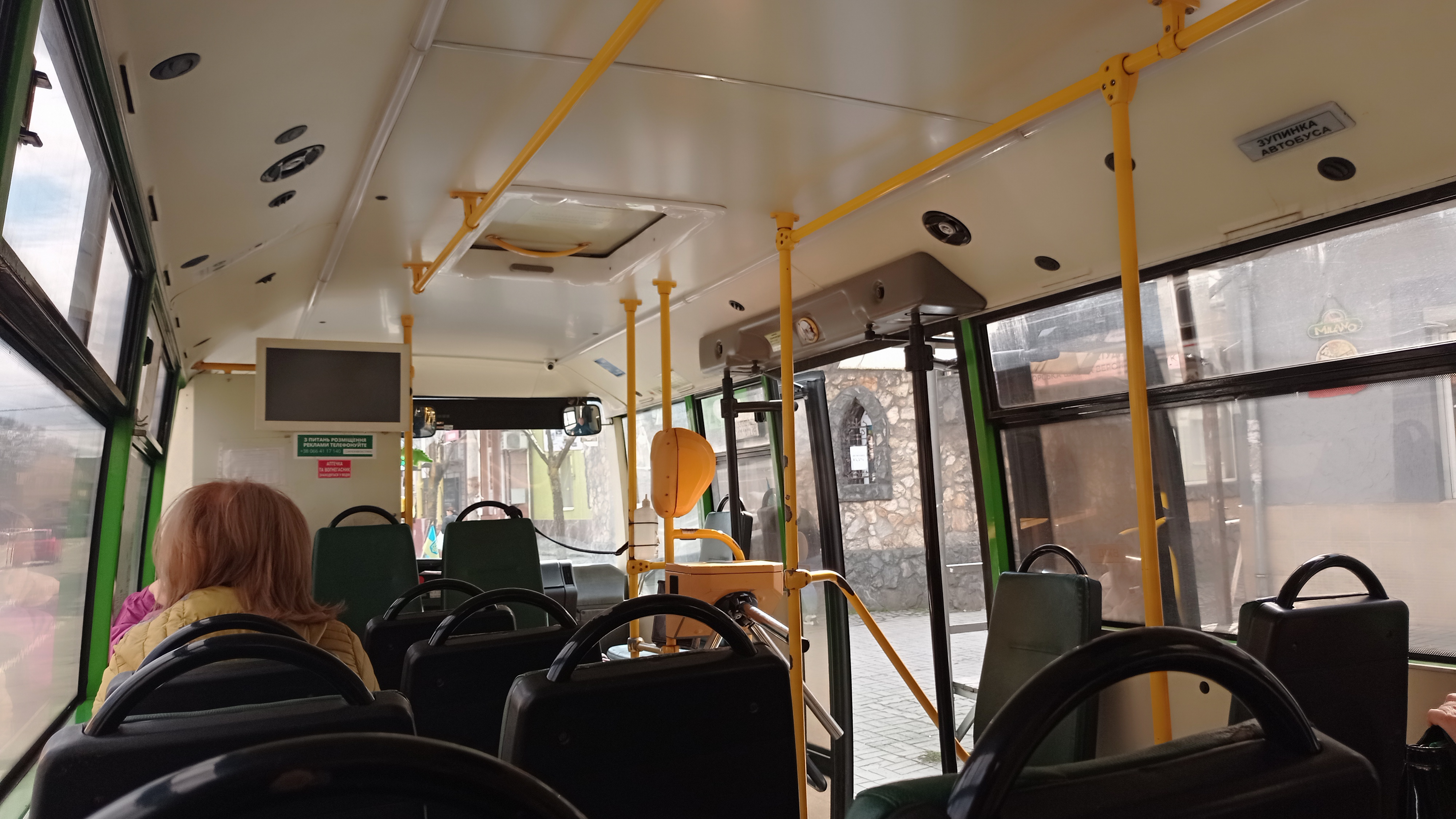
Interior

== Other uses of model index ==
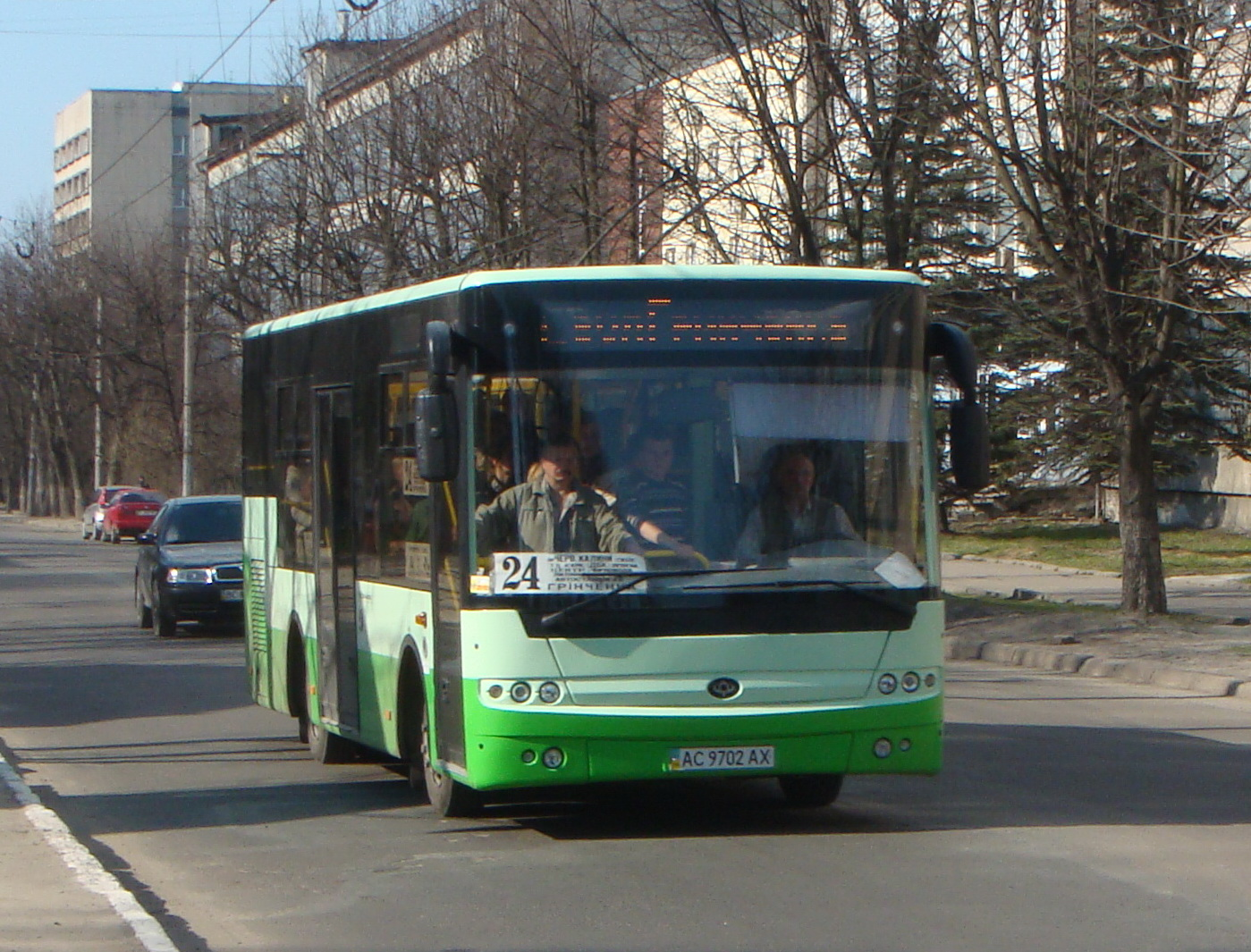
Bogdan A09280

In 2009 Bogdan designed their new midibus as a part of their new A701 lineup developed alongside former workers of Lviv's LAZ that ran into problems with its new ownership. The lineup was heavily based on LAZ A183 and was built on its own chassis as opposed to previous models based on Asian trucks. The bus premiered at TIR-2010 under the name Bogdan A09280 despite not being related to A092 models. There were plans to make a cheaper Euro-2 engine model called A09282 but they've never come to fruition. The new model had never entered the serial production, only six unit were built in 2010-2011, all delivered to Ternopil. Best selling models of the A701 lineup eventually became trolleybuses.

== See also ==
- Bogdan (bus model)
