= Bogdan (bus model) =

Ukrainian brand of buses

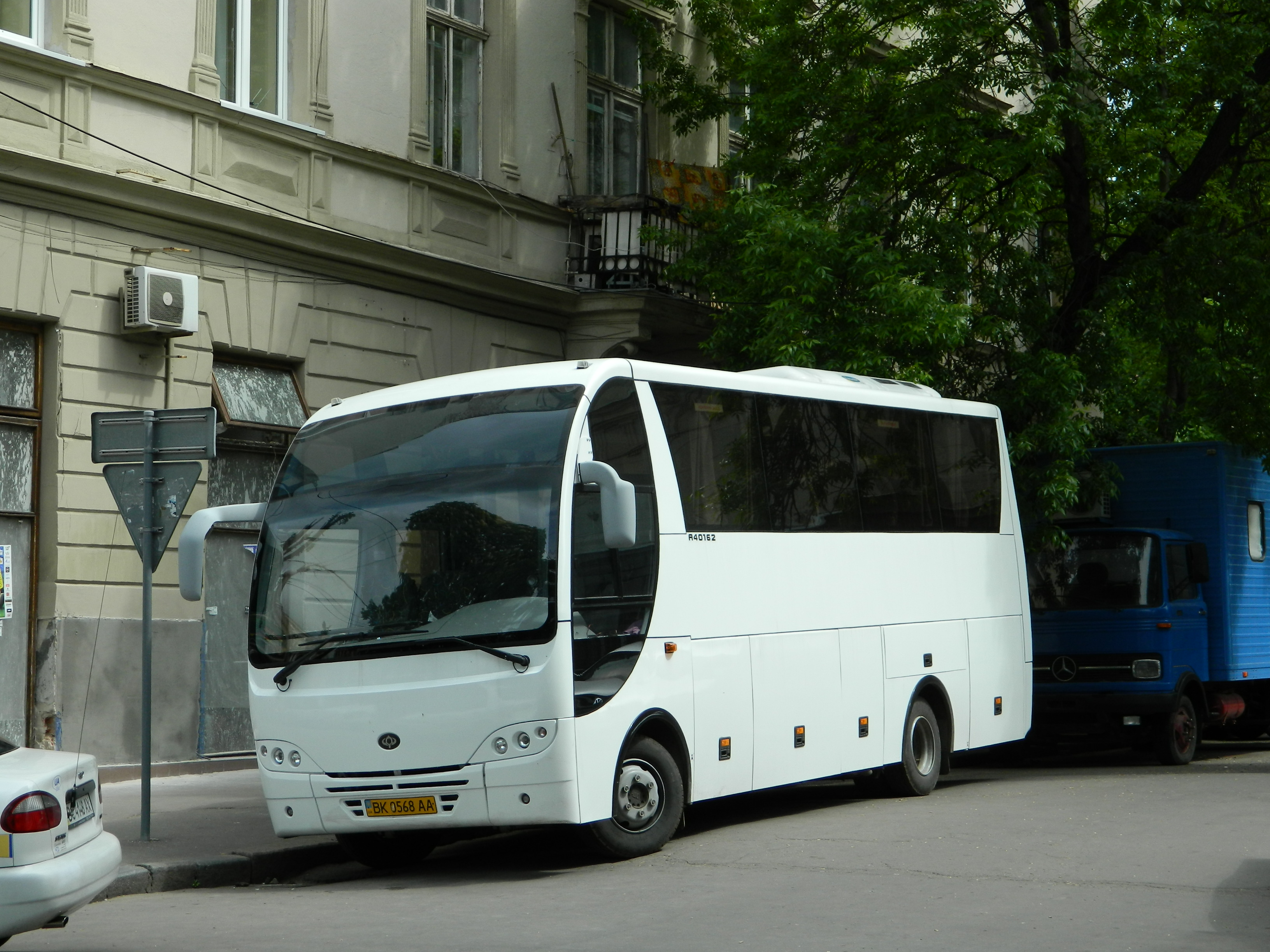
Midi-bus Bohdan A40162

Bogdan (Ukrainian: Богдан, romanized: Bohdan) is the brand of the Ukrainian buses and trolleybuses made by Bogdan Corporation. The original two front-engine/rear-wheel drive models (Bohdan A091 and Bohdan A092) are powered by Isuzu and marketed outside Ukraine under Isuzu brand. Large city buses, such as the rear-engined Bogdan A145 and Bohdan A1445, are also produced. The production is situated in the city of Cherkasy, although there are plans of moving it to the LuAZ plant in the city of Lutsk. These vehicles are generally serving as marshrutka (routed taxicab / minibus) in former Soviet regions. The plant was originally the Cherkasy Autorepair Plant, which was founded in 1964.

== Serial production models ==
=== Small class minibuses ===
- Bogdan A064 (2003–2005) – based on Isuzu
- Bogdan A067 (2005–2006) – based on Foton
- Bogdan A069 (2006–2013) – based on Hyundai
- Bogdan A049 (2010–2011) – based on GAZ
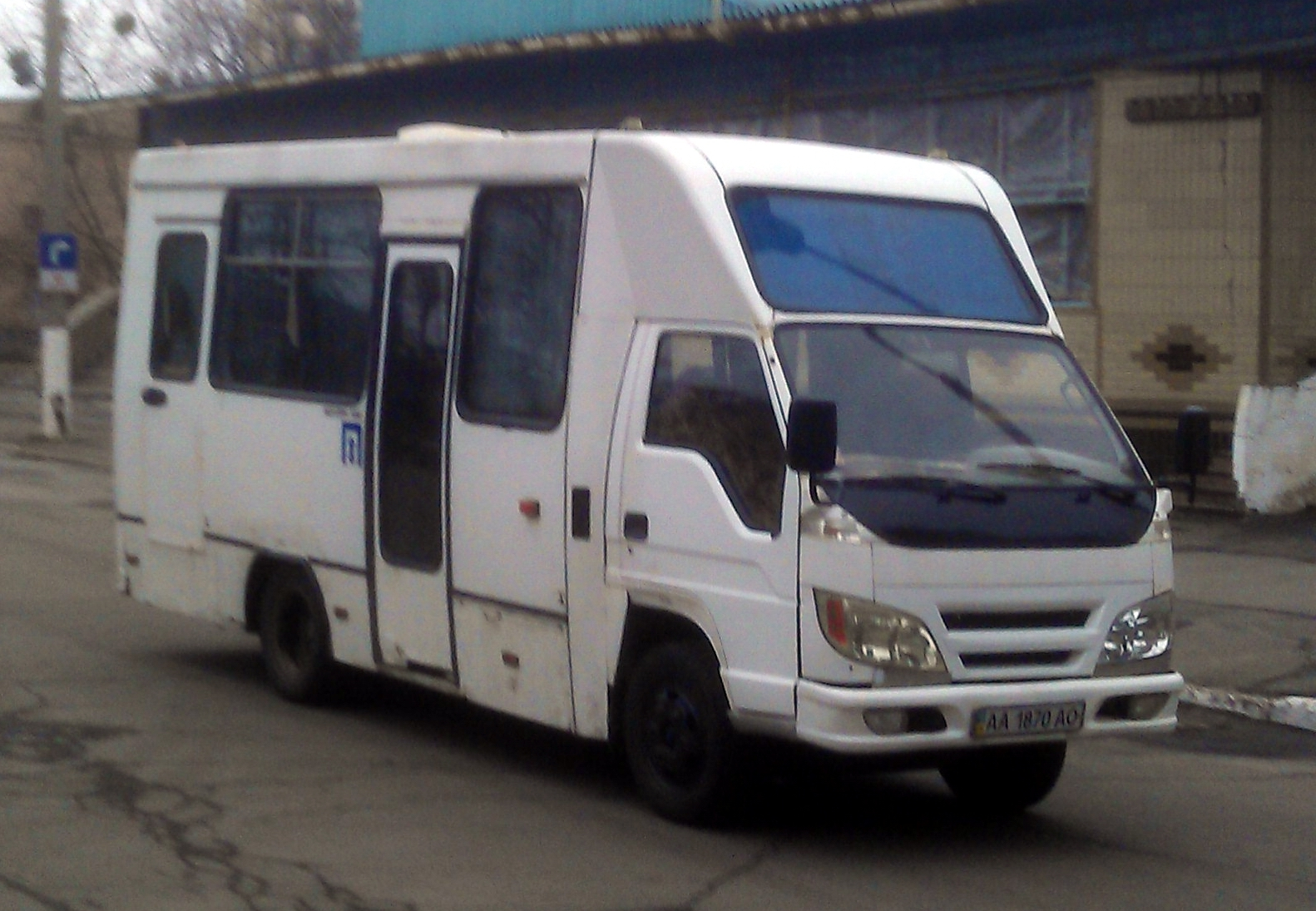
Bogdan A067 in Kyiv

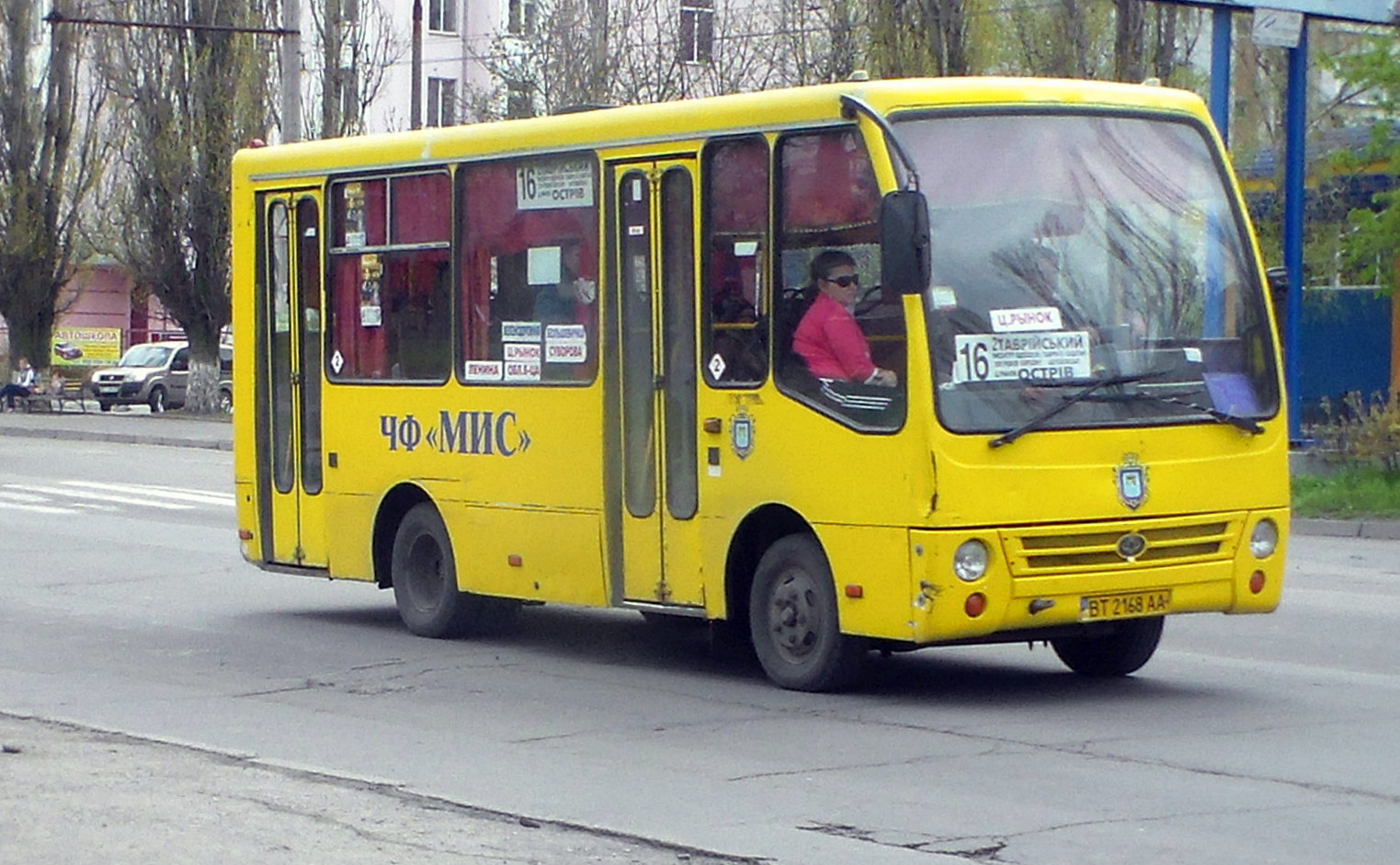
Bogdan A069 in Kherson

=== Medium class minibuses ===
- Bogdan A091 (1999–2005) – based on Isuzu
- Bogdan A092 (2003–2011) – based on Isuzu
- Bogdan A201 (2011–2021) – based on Hyundai
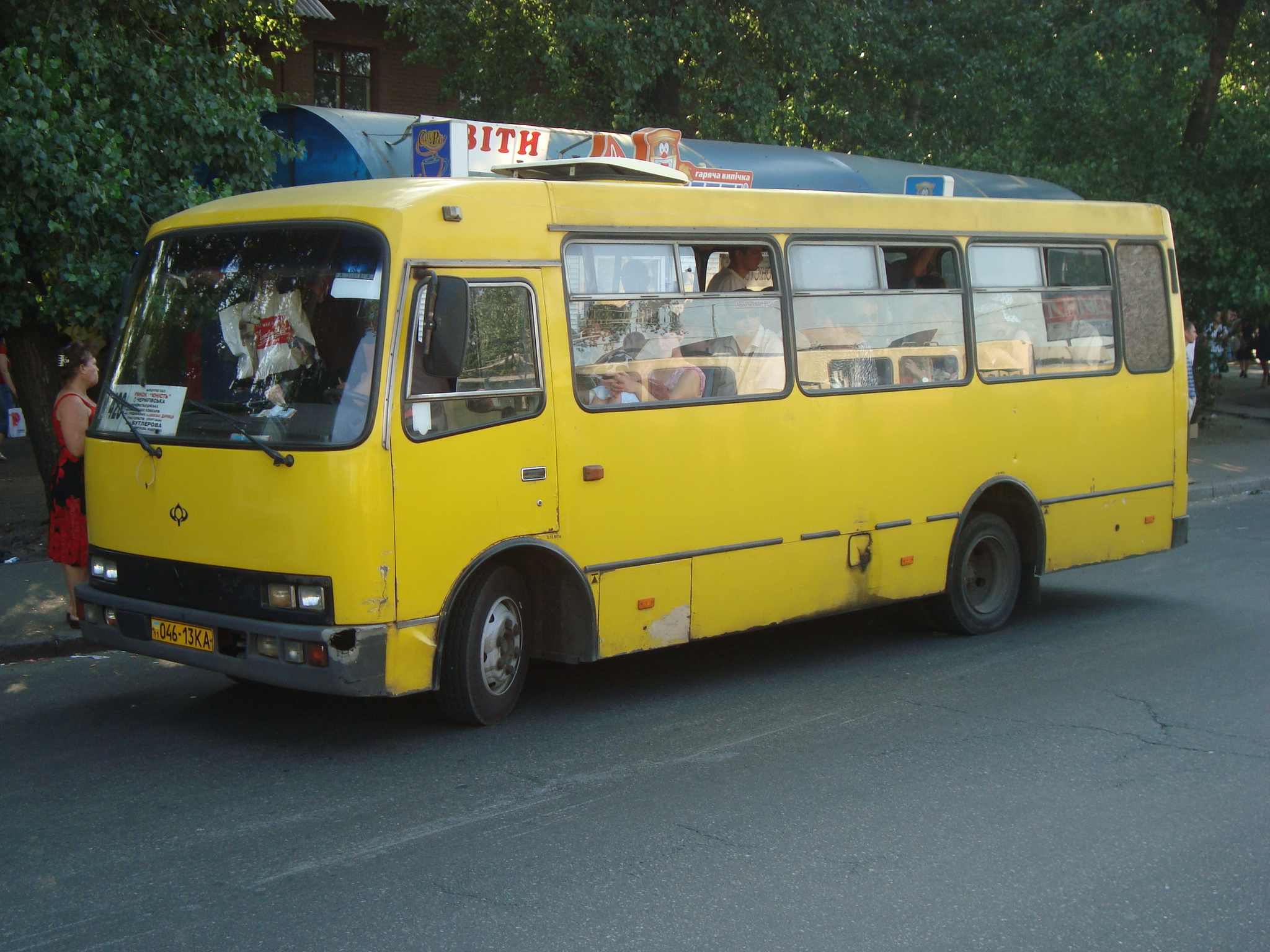
Bogdan A091 in Kyiv

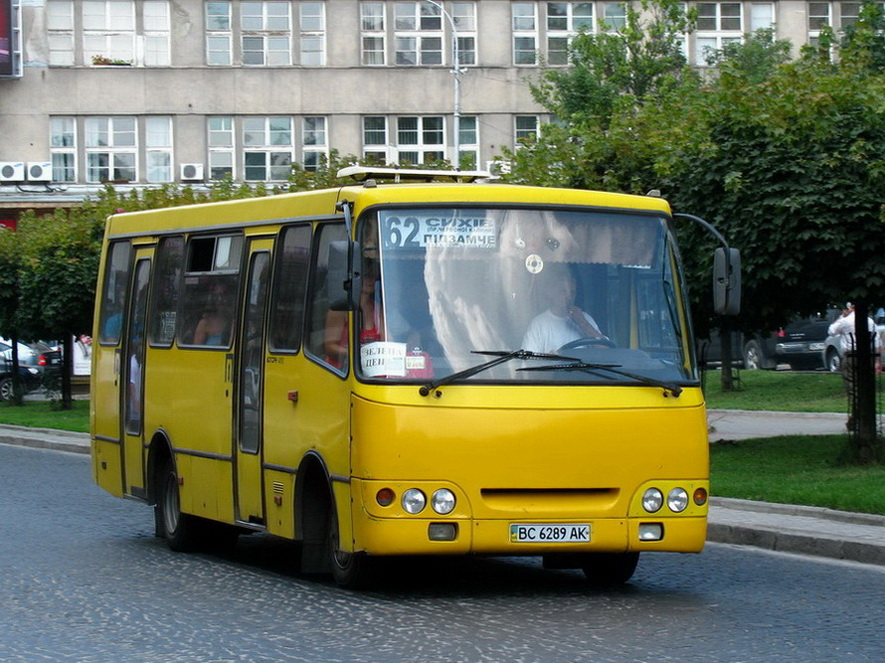
Bogdan A092 in Lviv

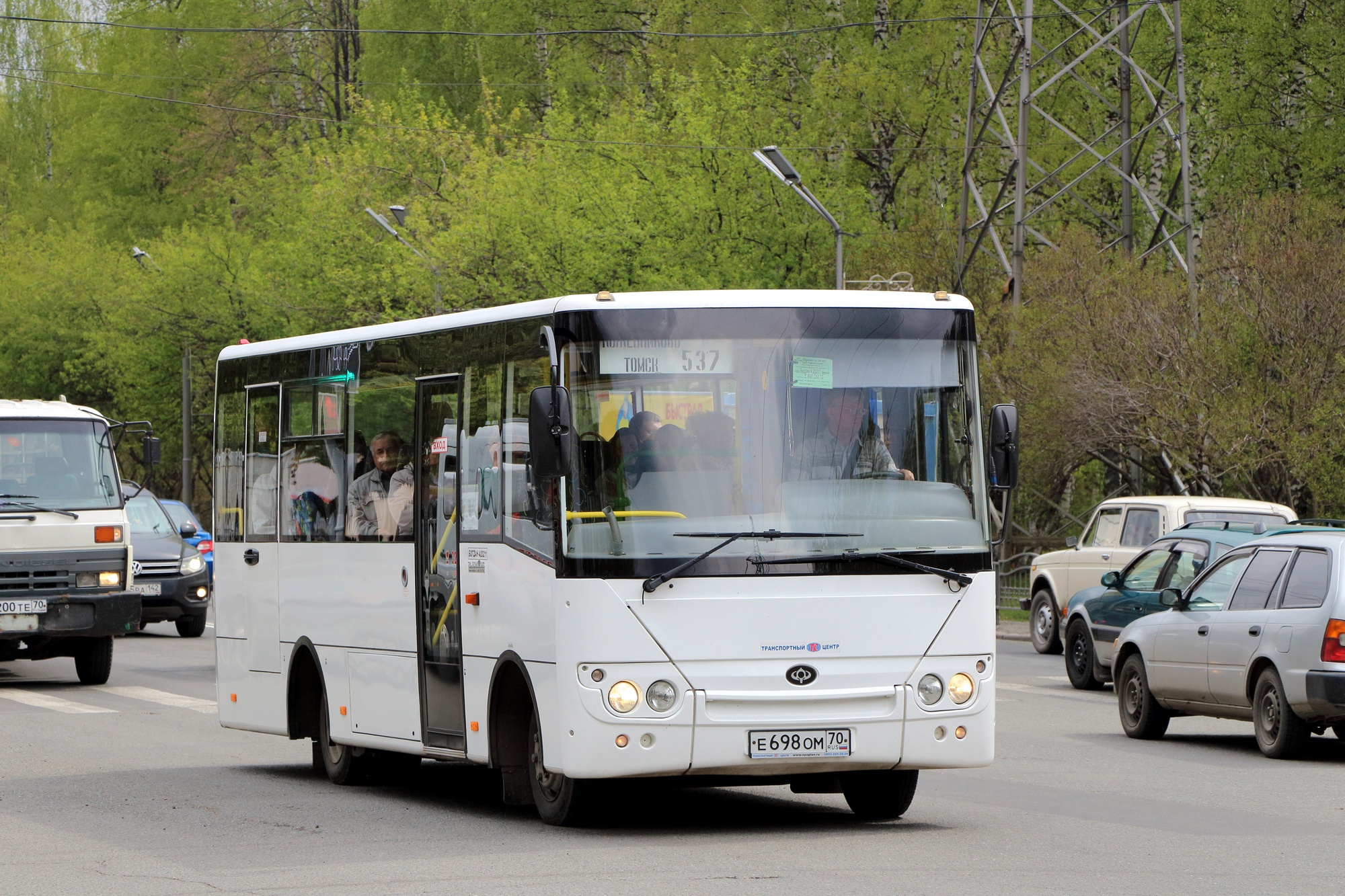
Bogdan A201 in Tomsk

=== Medium class intercity buses ===
- Bogdan A301 (2007–2010) – based on Isuzu

=== Large class intercity buses ===
- Bogdan A145 (2003–2015) – based on Isuzu
- Bogdan A14542 (2016–2021)

=== Large class city buses ===
- Bogdan A144 (2003–2011) – based on Isuzu
- Bogdan A601 (2008)
- Bogdan A701 (2011–2021)
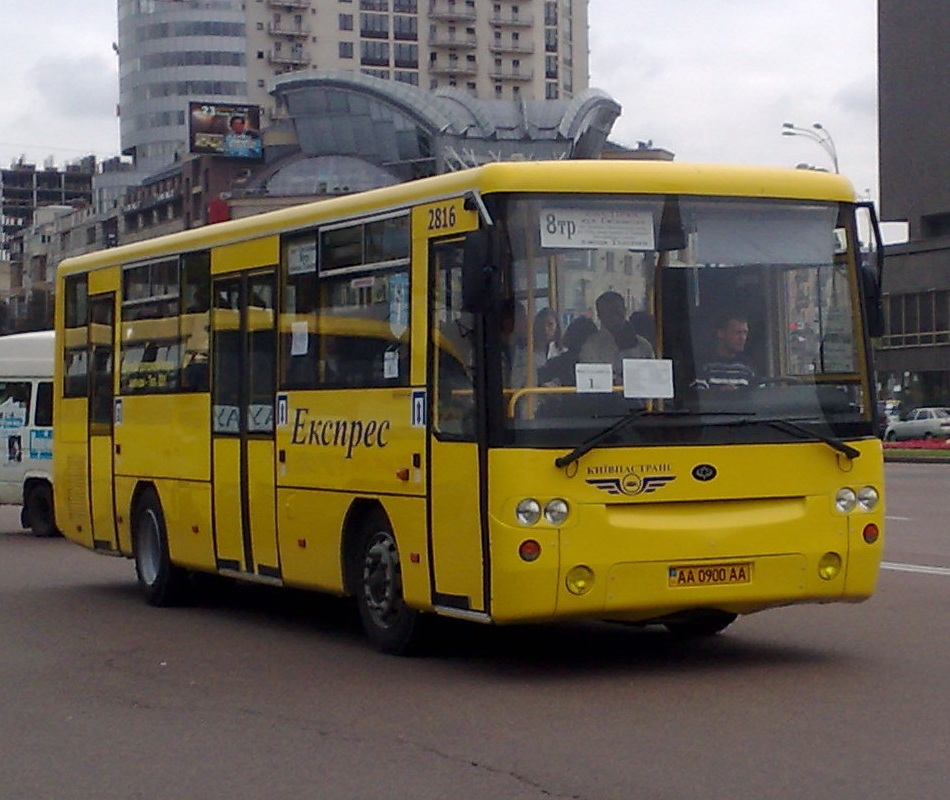
Bogdan A144 in Kyiv

=== Medium class coaches ===
- Bogdan A401 (2007–2008) – based on Isuzu
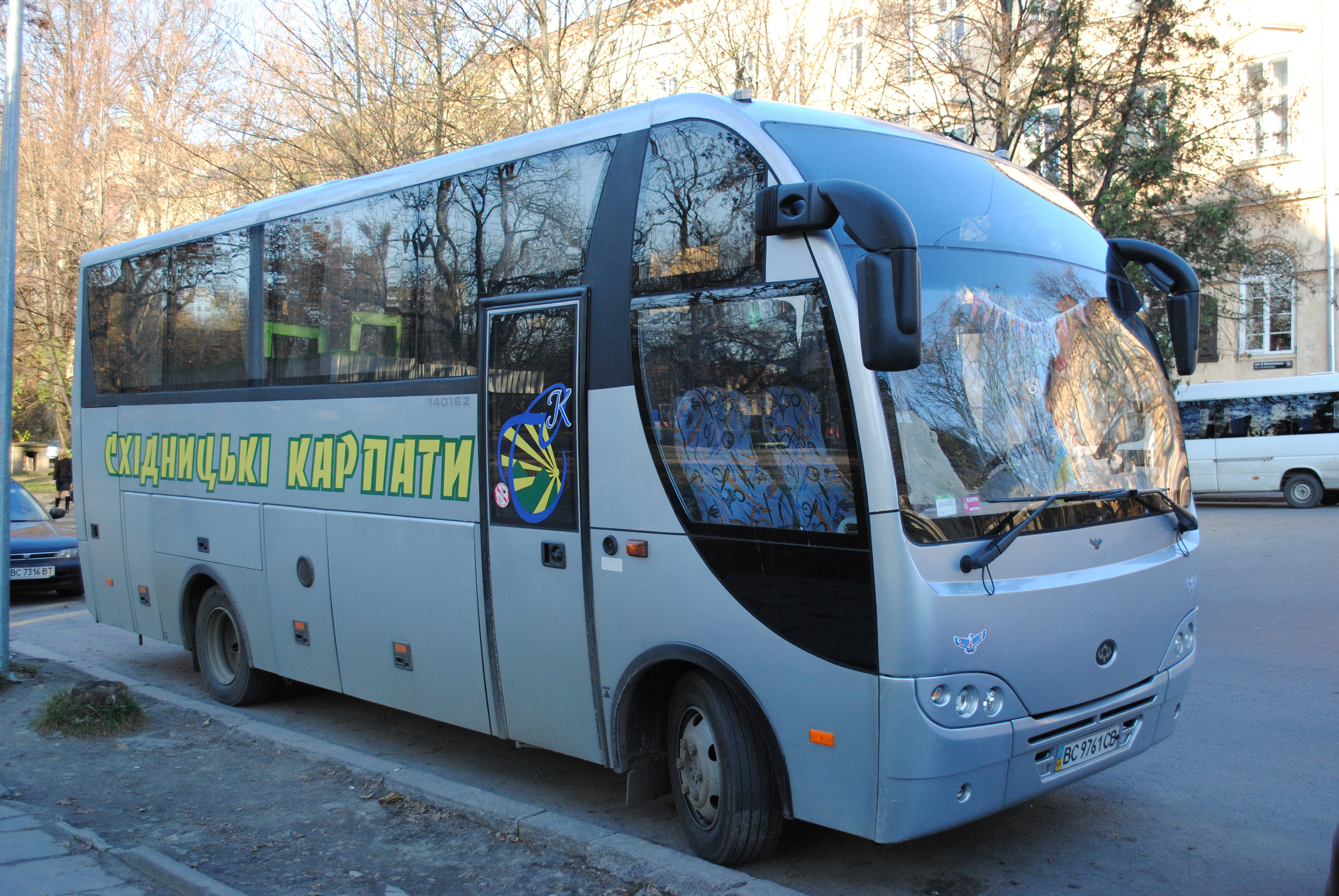
Bogdan A401 in Lviv

=== Small class trolleybuses ===
- Bogdan T601 (2008–2011)
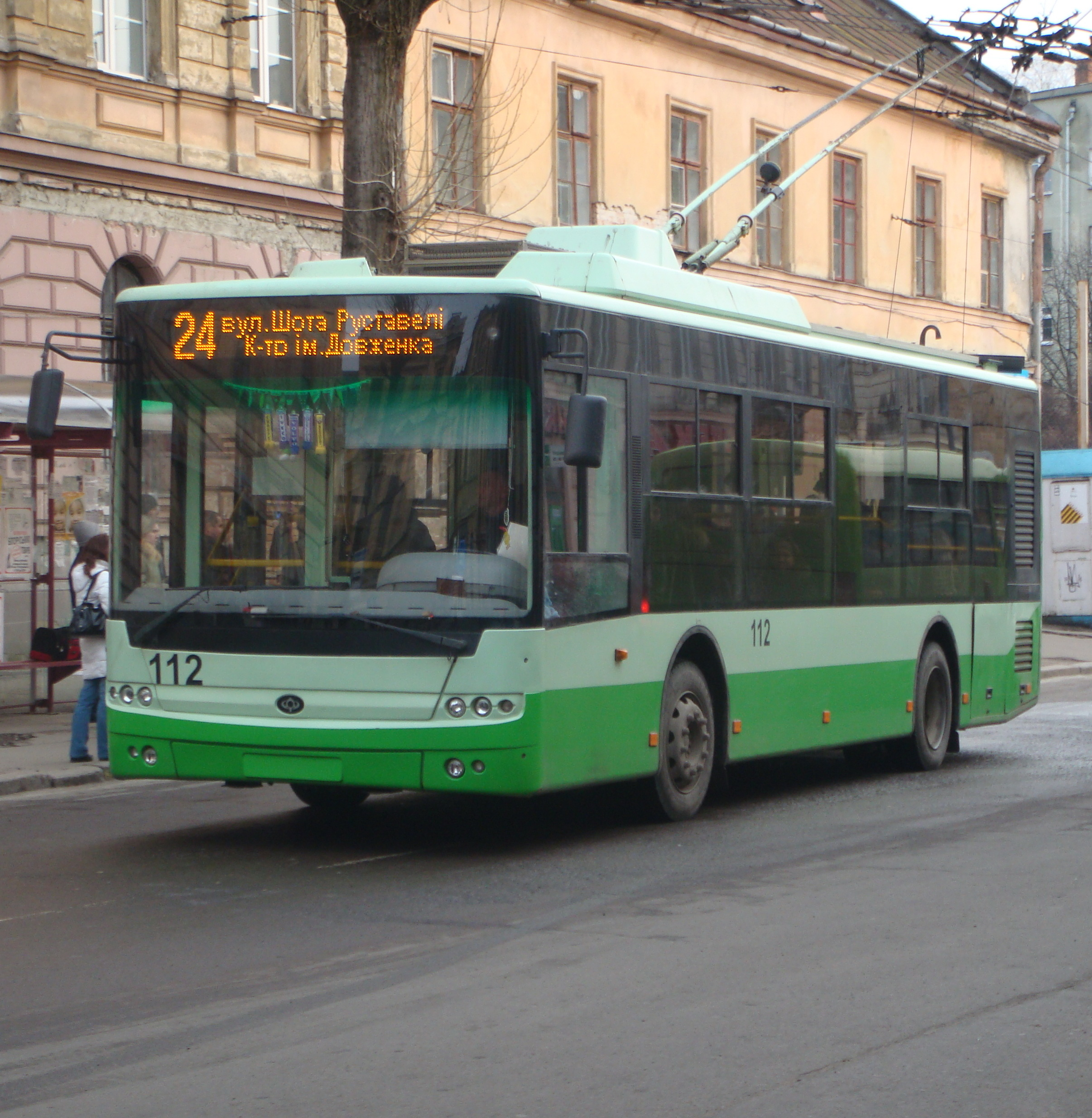
Bogdan T601 in Lviv

=== Large class trolleybuses ===
- Bogdan T701 (2010–2022)
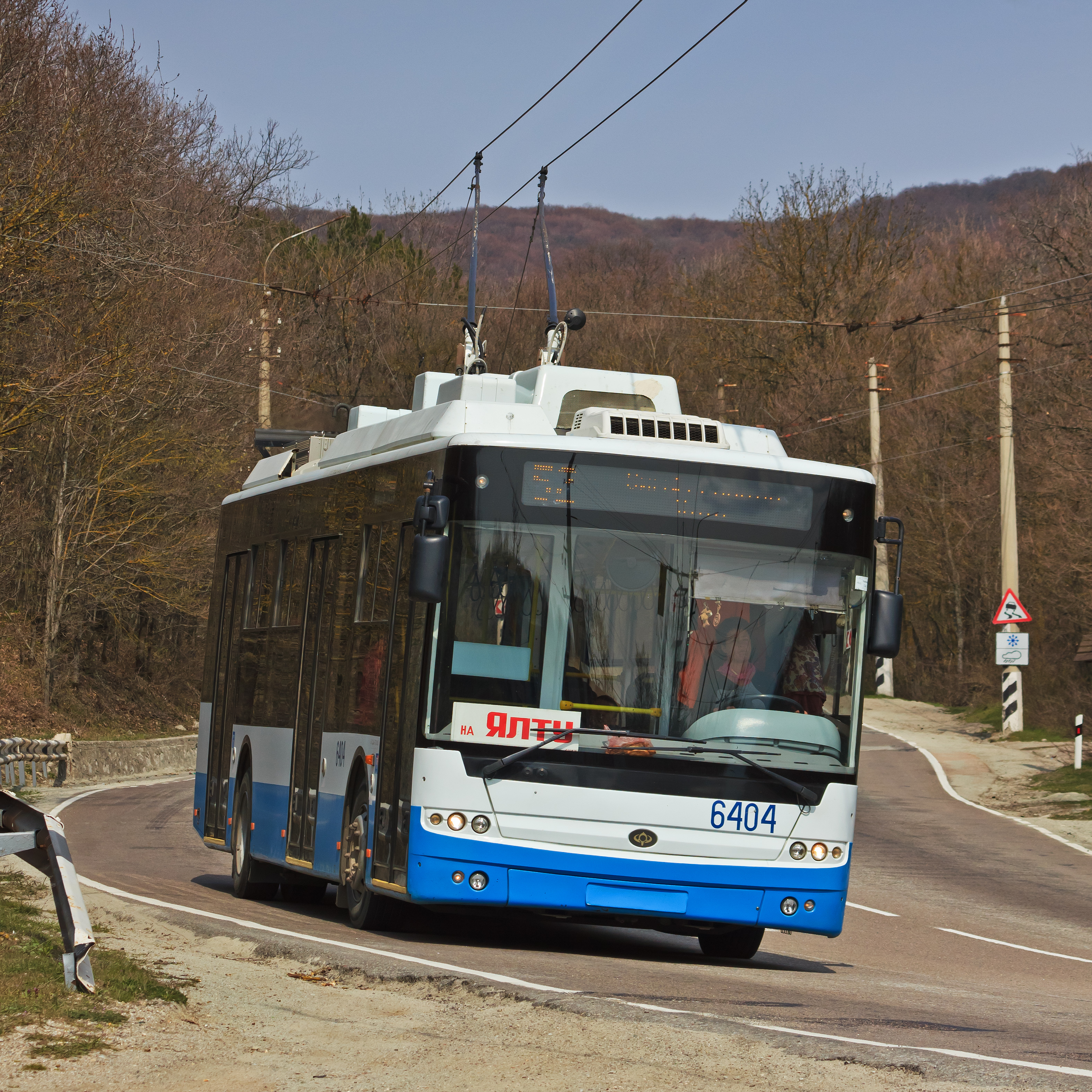
Bogdan T701 in Alushta

=== Articulated trolleybuses ===
- Bogdan T901 (2012–2021)
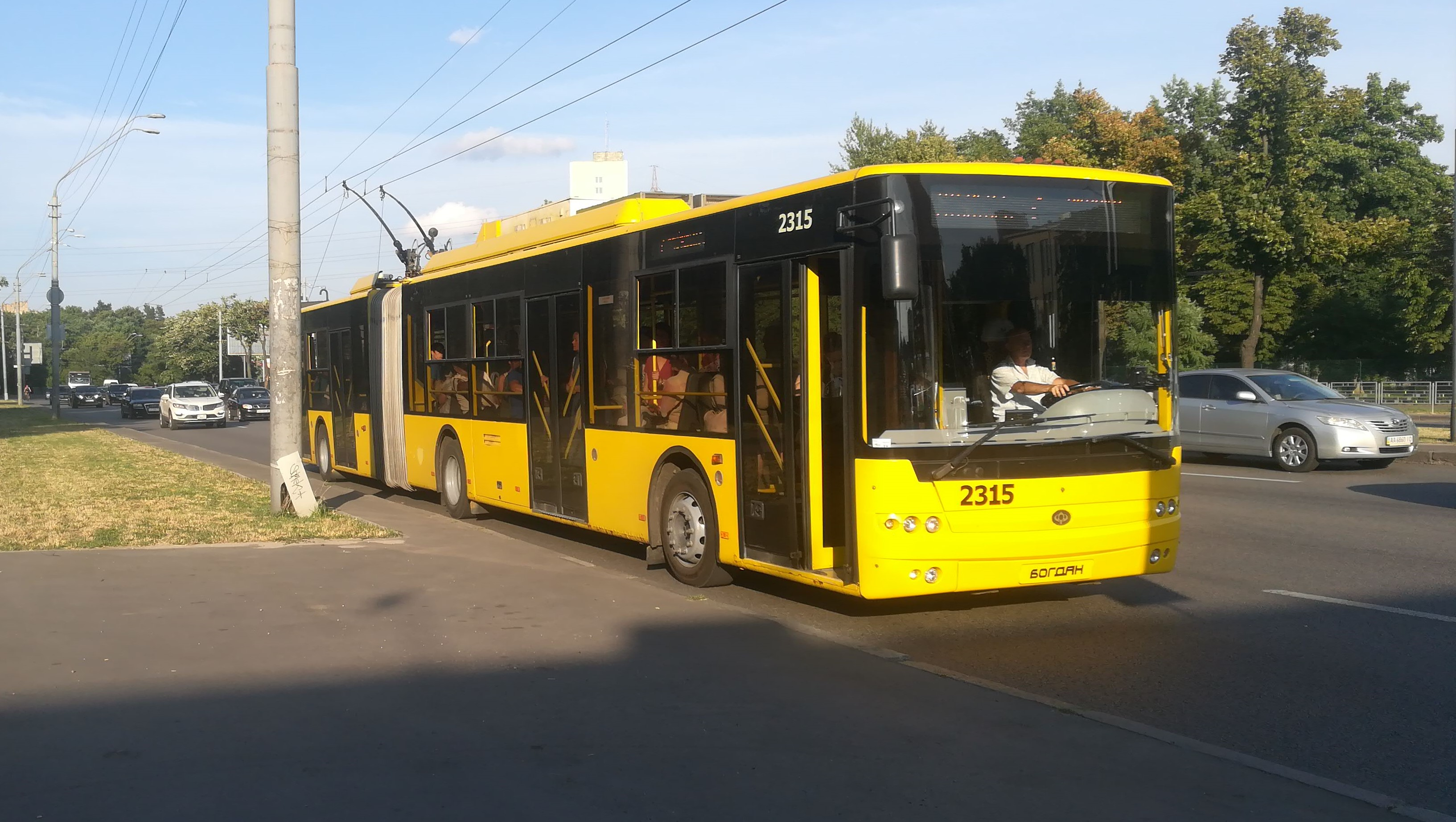
Bogdan T901 in Kyiv

== Prototype models ==
=== Small class minibuses ===
- Bogdan A062 (2003) – based on Isuzu

=== Small class city buses ===
- Bogdan A501 (2007) – based on Isuzu
- Bogdan A601 (2009) – based on Isuzu
- Bogdan A09280 (2010) – based on Isuzu
- Bogdan A302 (2011)
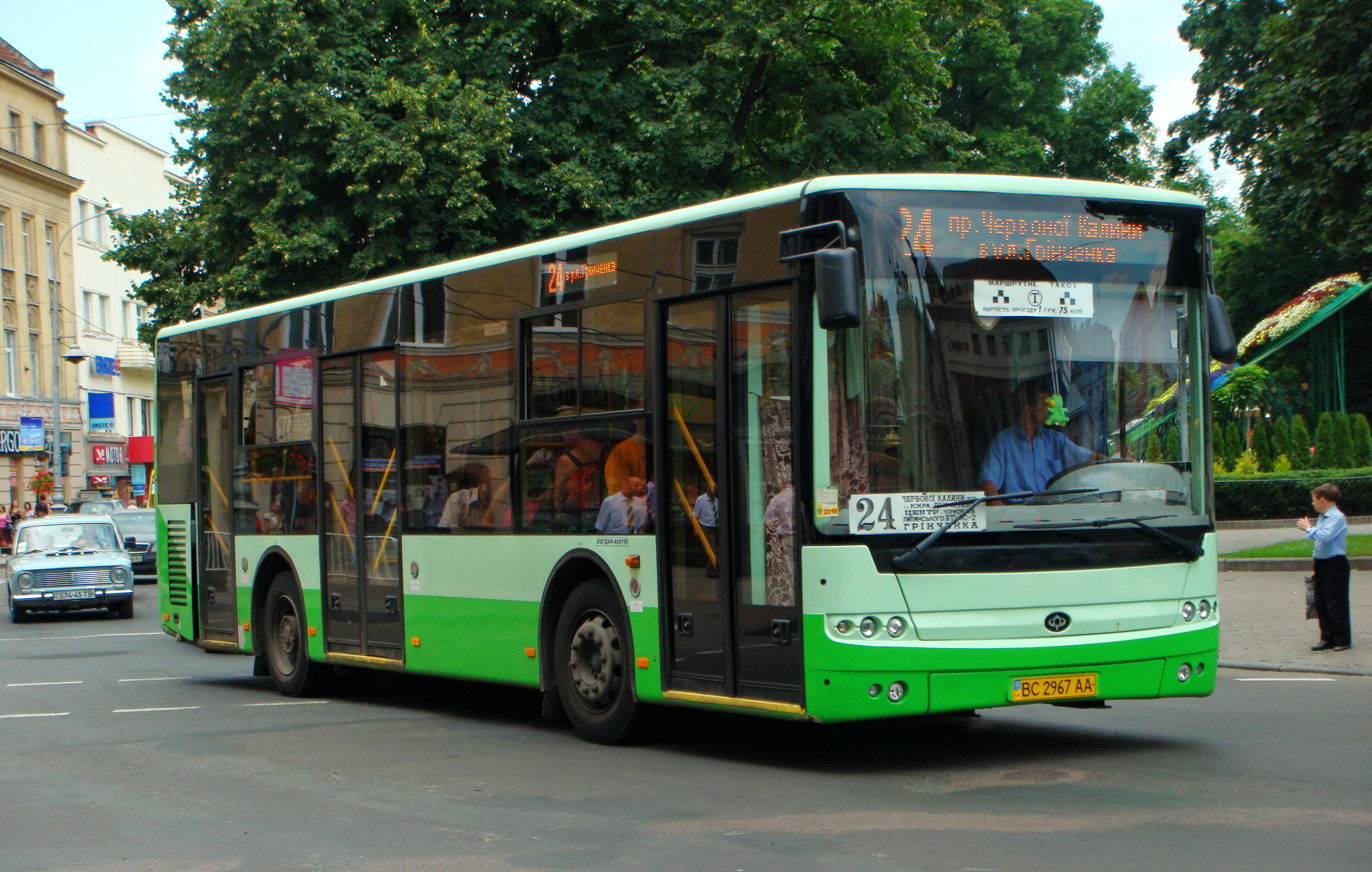
Bogdan A601 in Lviv

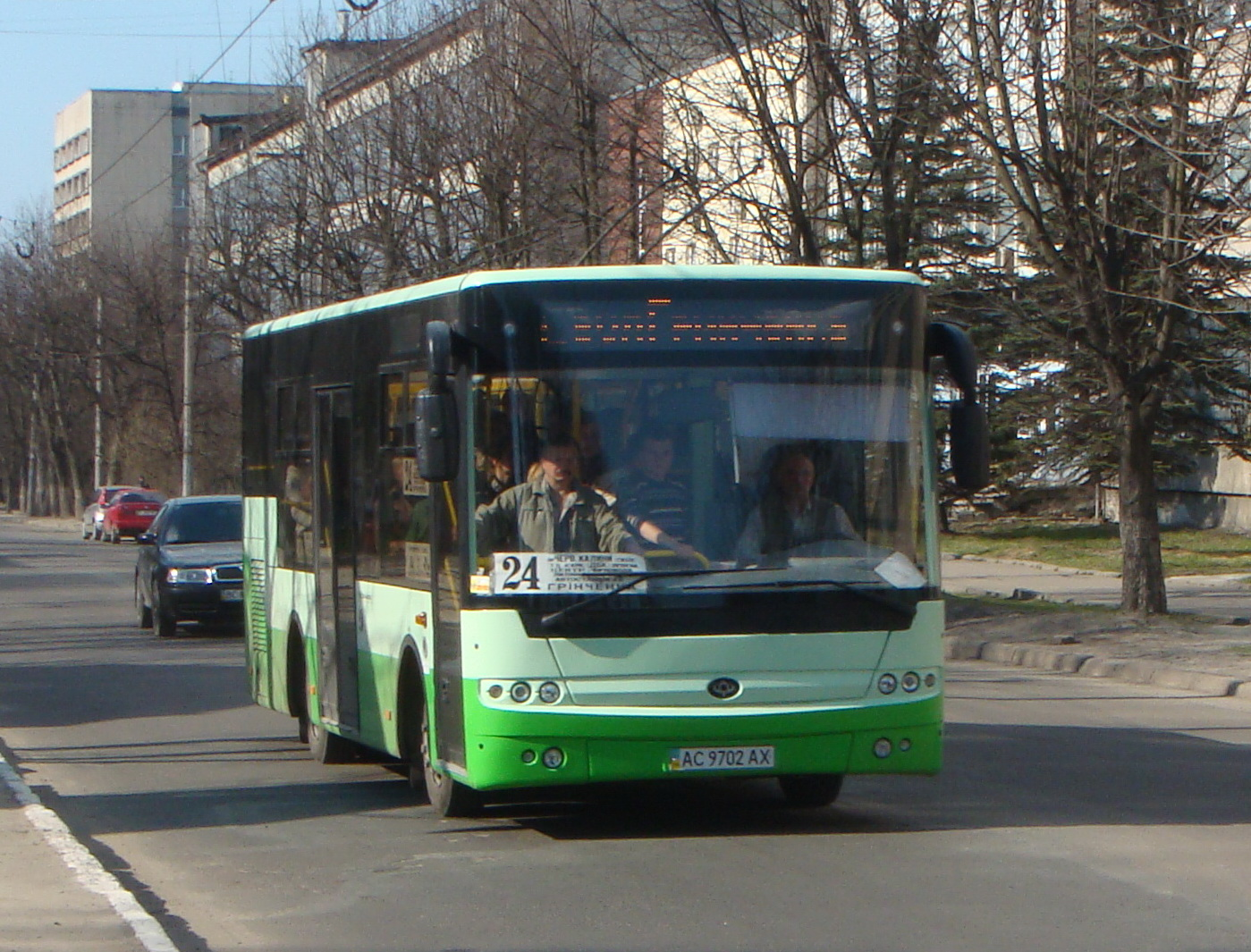
Bogdan A09280 in Lviv

=== Extra large class buses ===
- Bogdan A231 (2004)
- Bogdan A801 (2010)
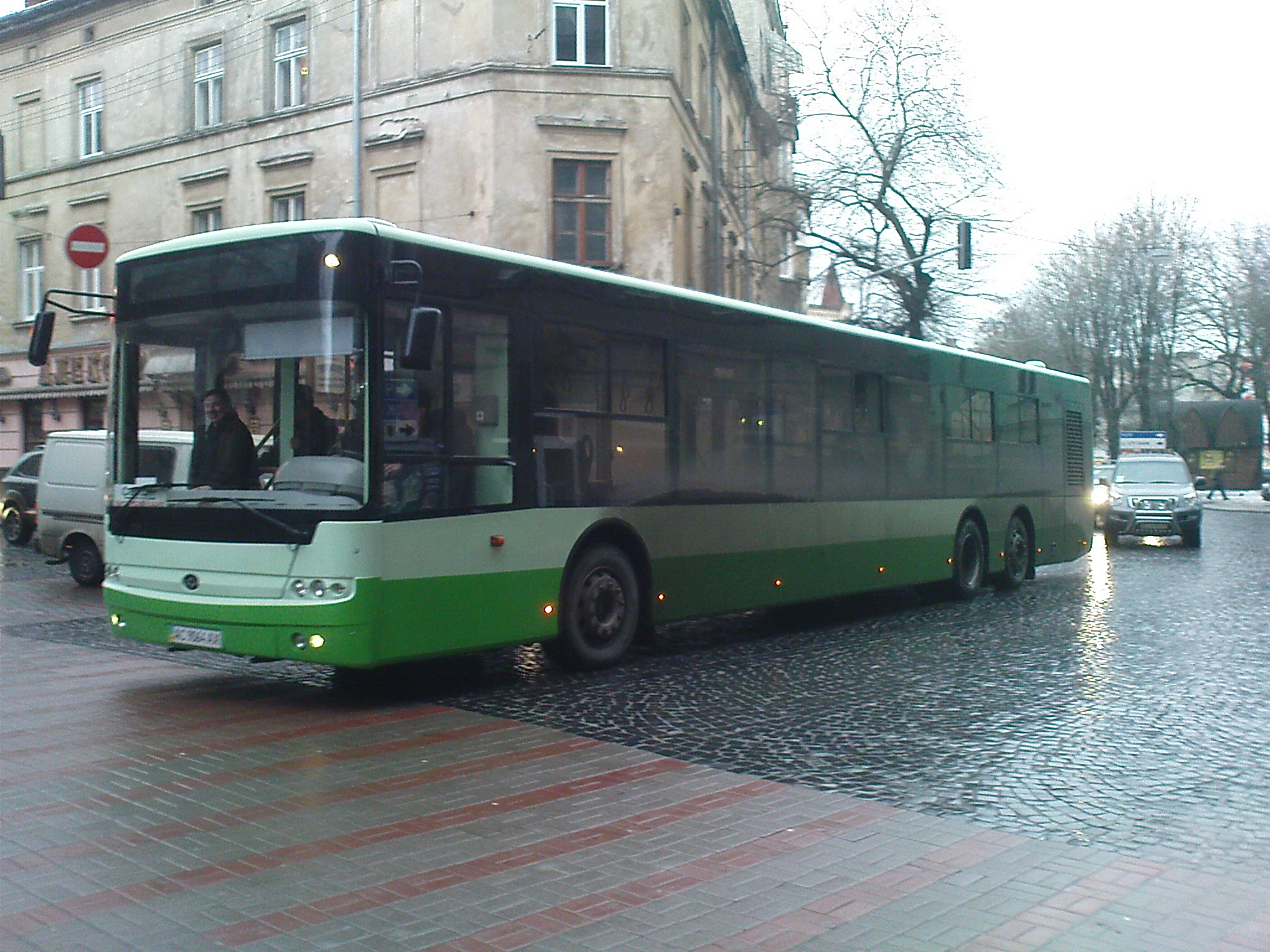
Bogdan A801 in Lutsk

=== Small class trolleybuses ===
- Bogdan T501 (2008)
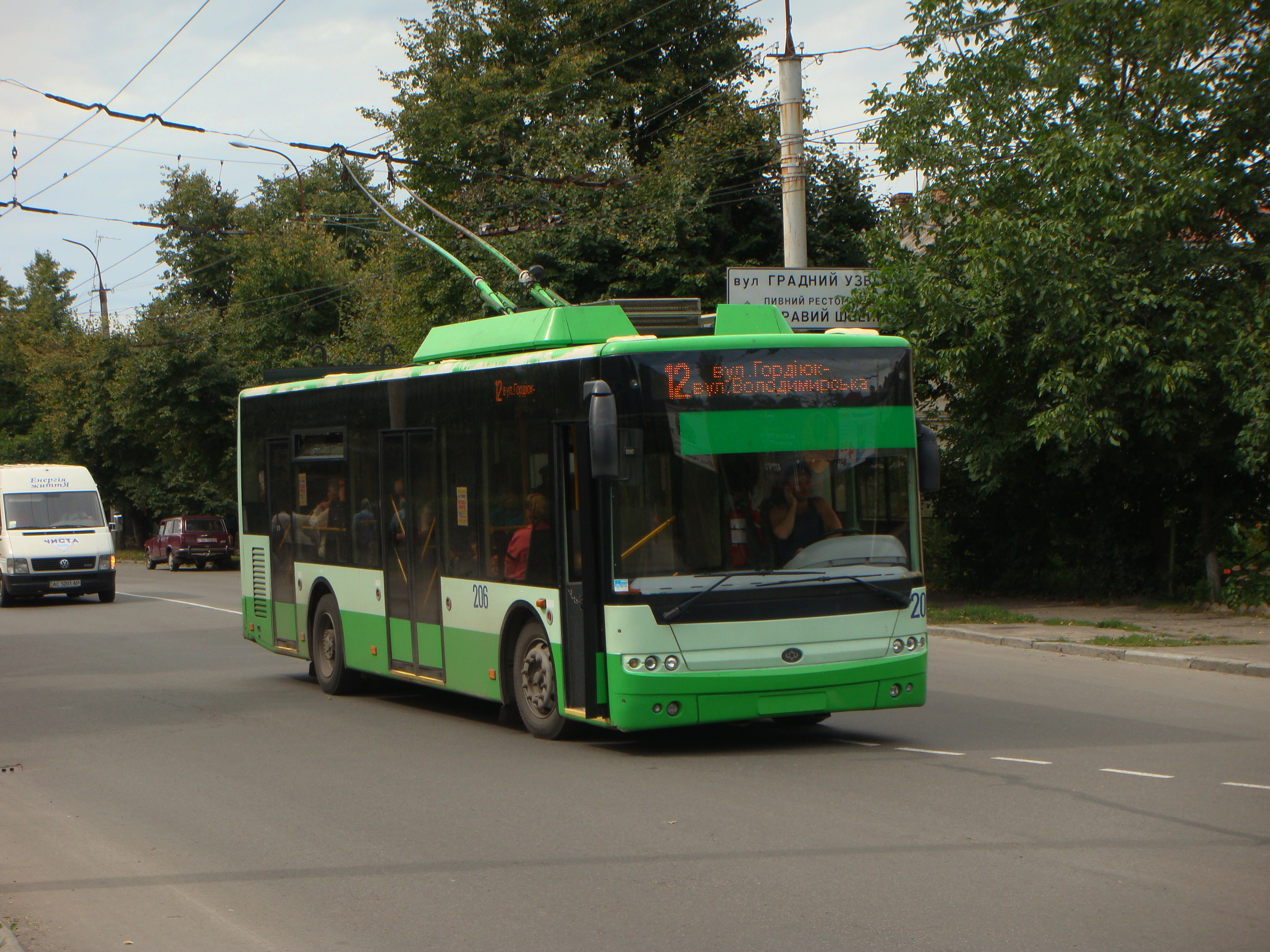
Bogdan T501 in Lutsk

=== Extra large class trolleybuses ===
- Bogdan E231 (2007)
- Bogdan T801 (2011)
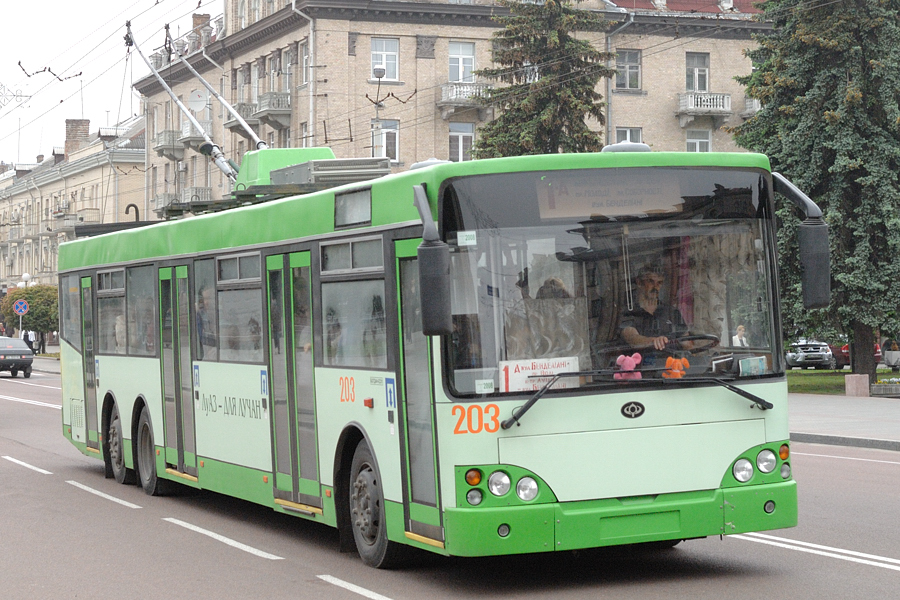
Bogdan E231 in Lutsk

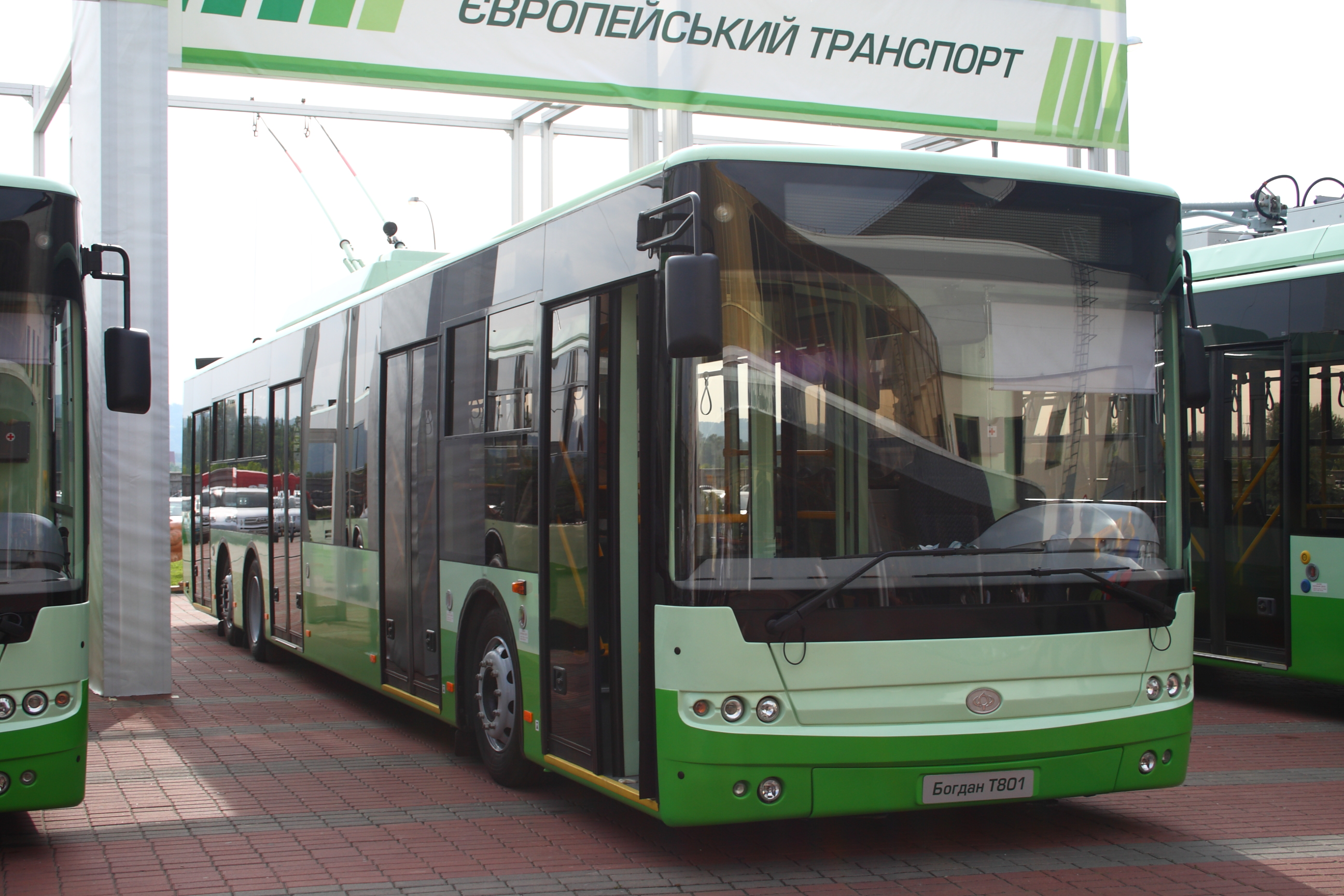
Bogdan T801 in Kyiv

== Gallery ==
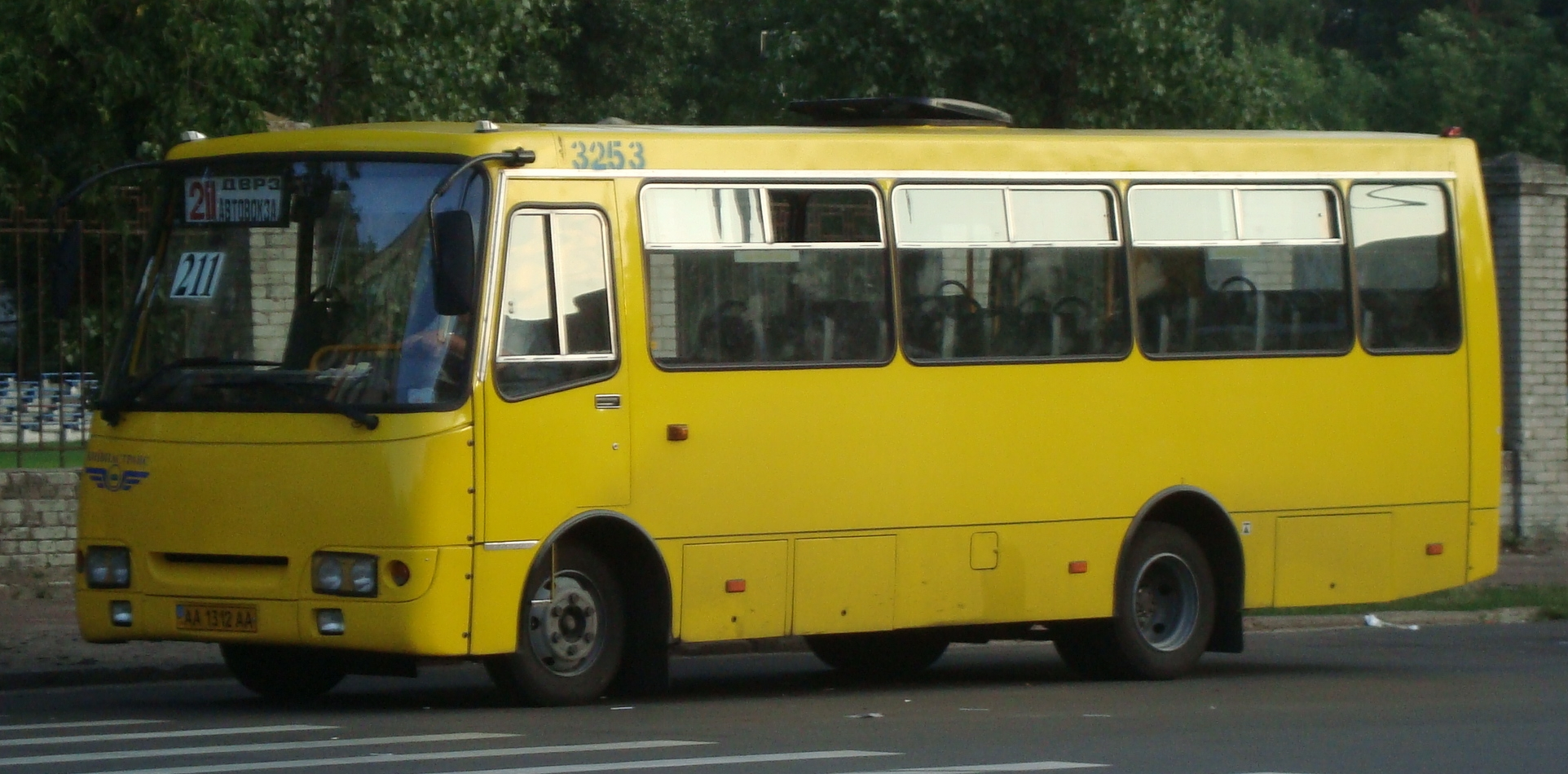
Bogdan A092

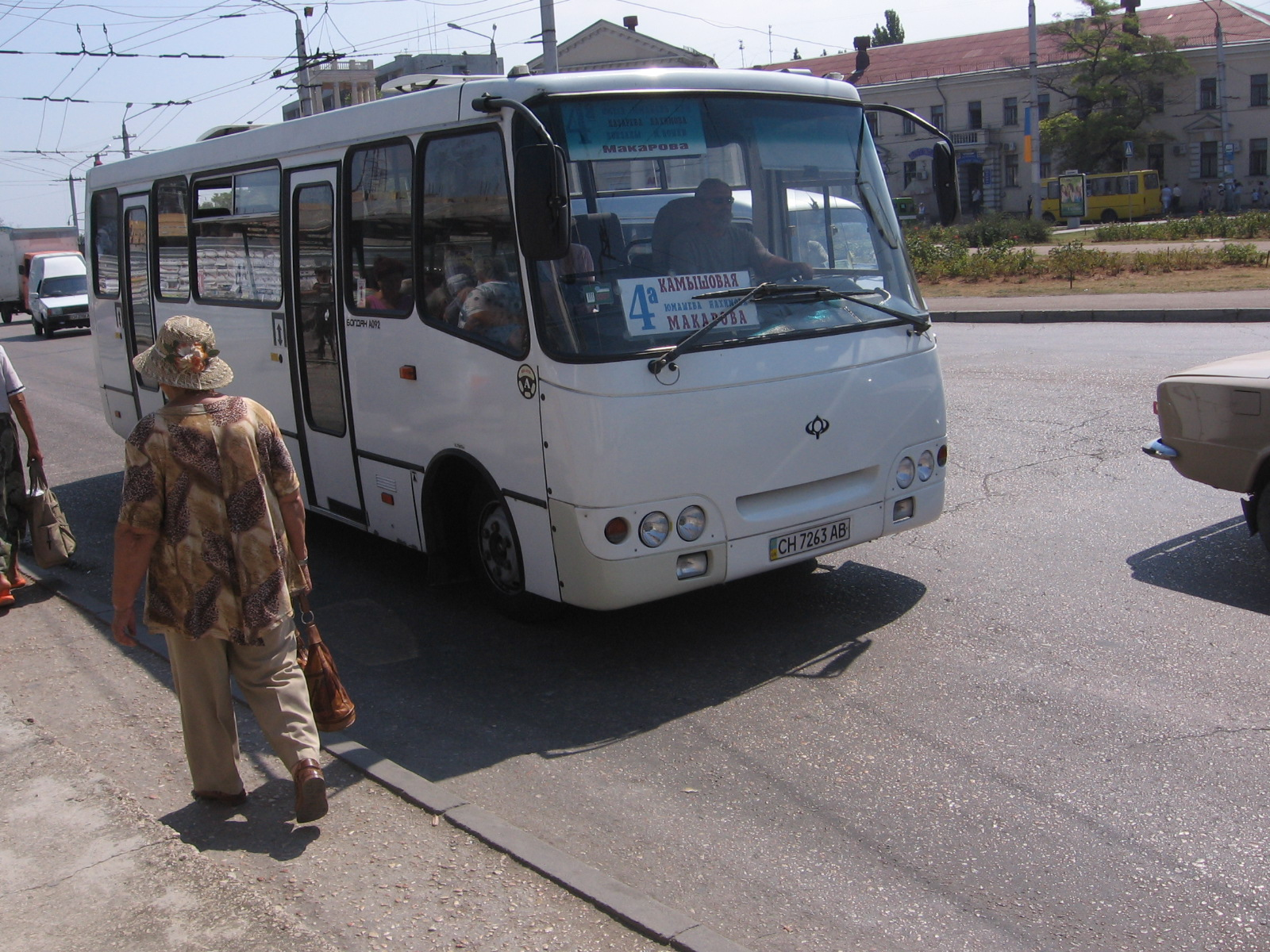
Bogdan A092 - Marshrutka in Sevastopol, Ukraine

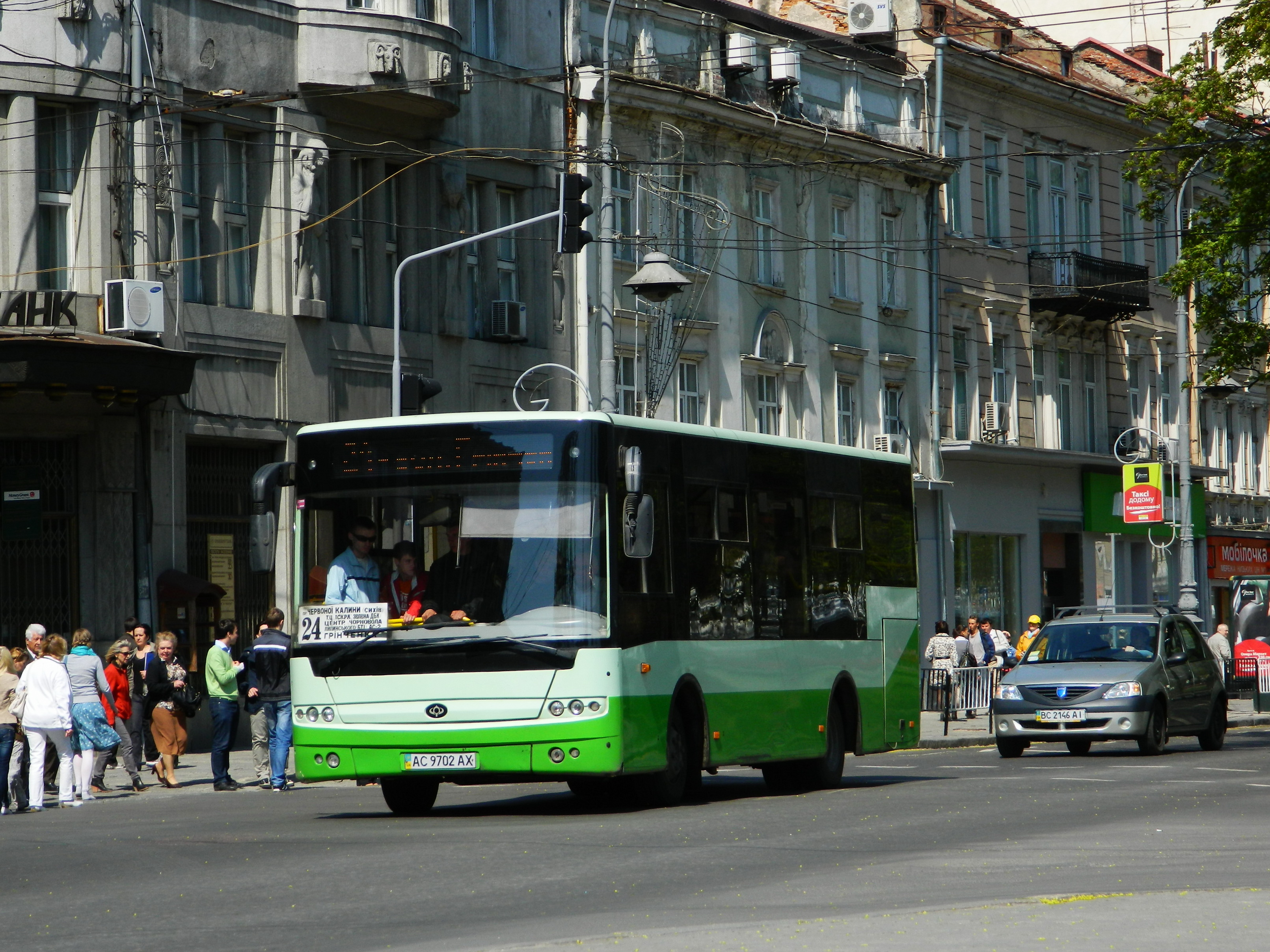
Bogdan A092.80 bus in Lviv, Ukraine

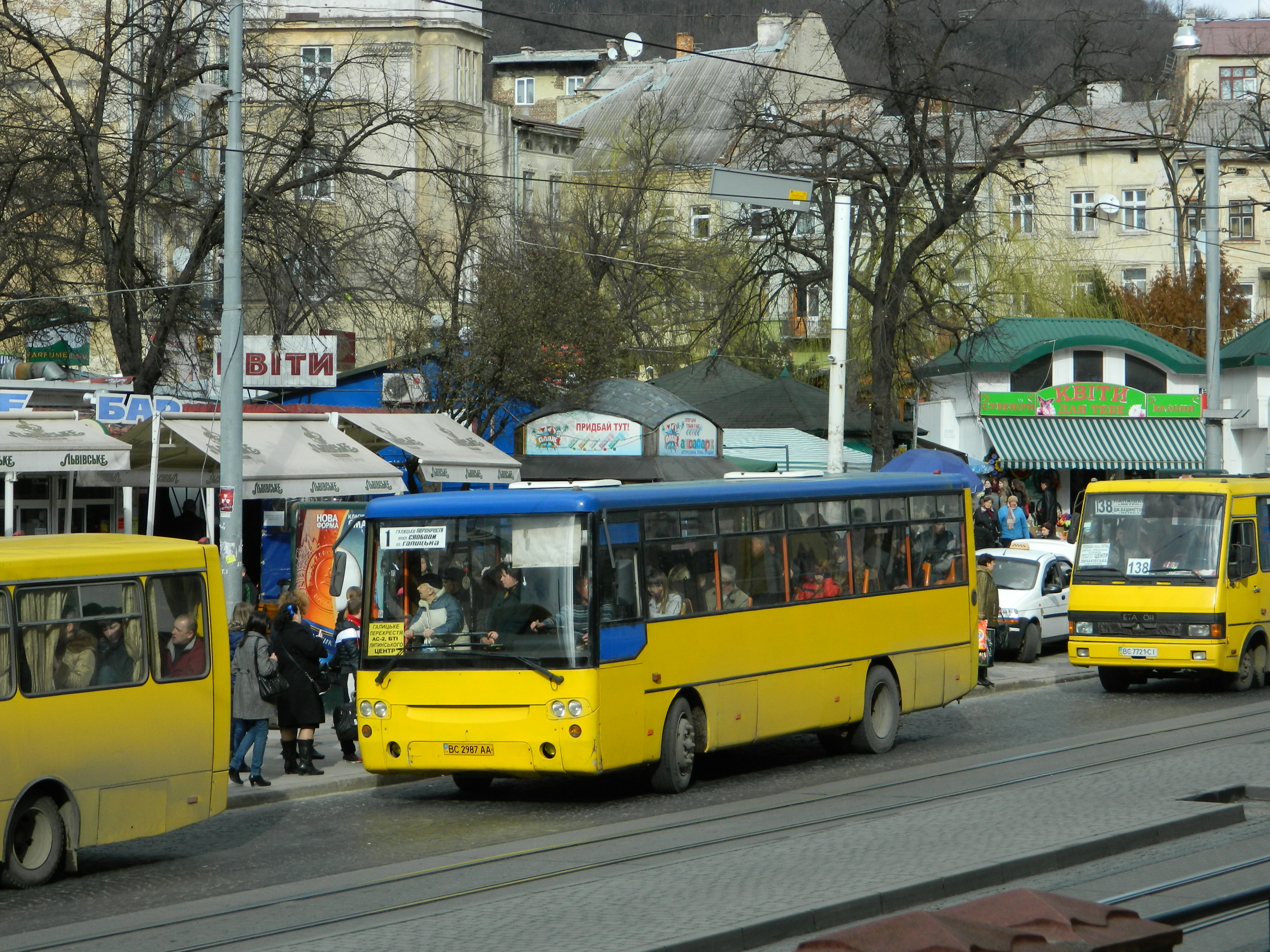
Bogdan A144

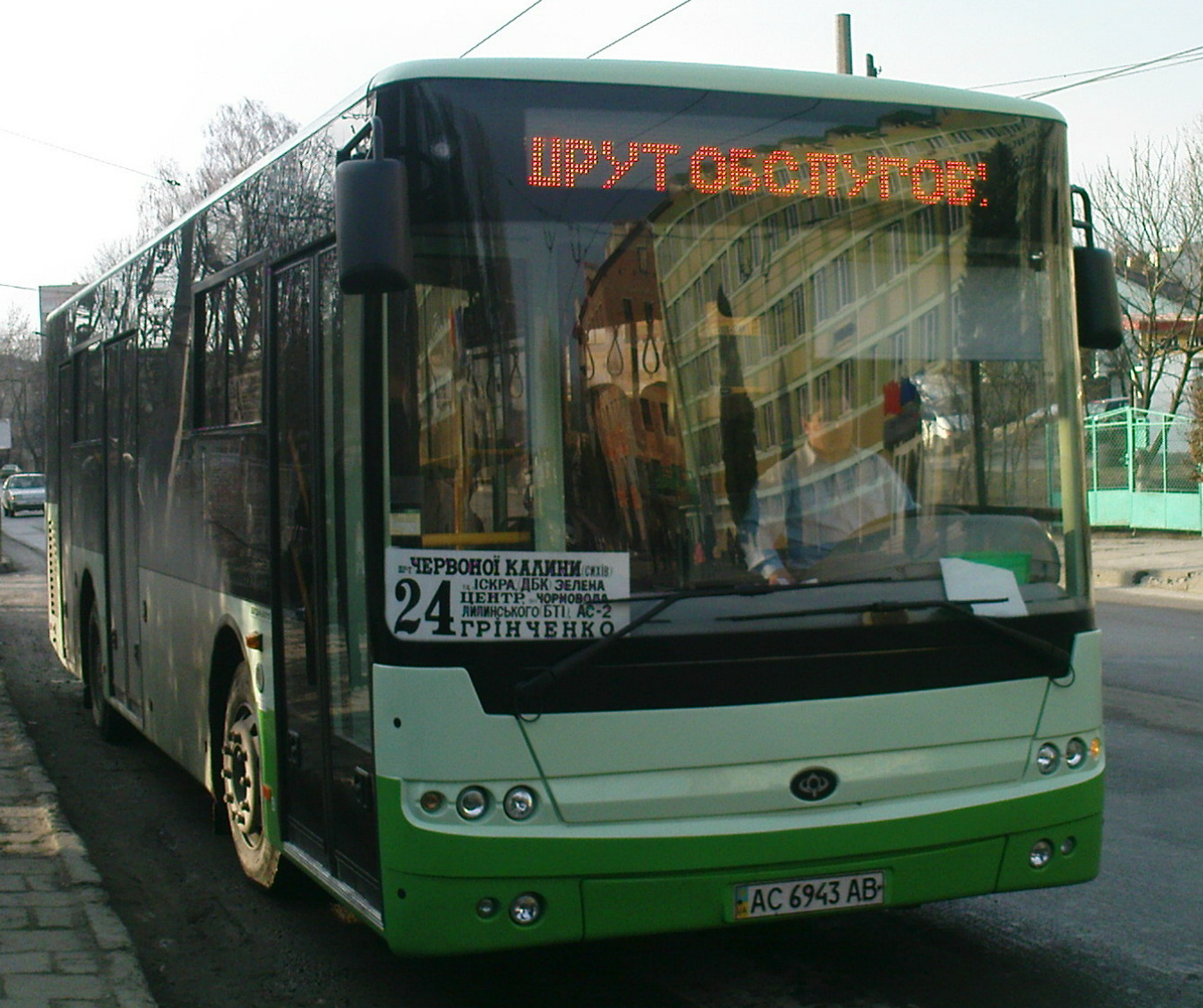
Bogdan A601.10 Lviv Premier

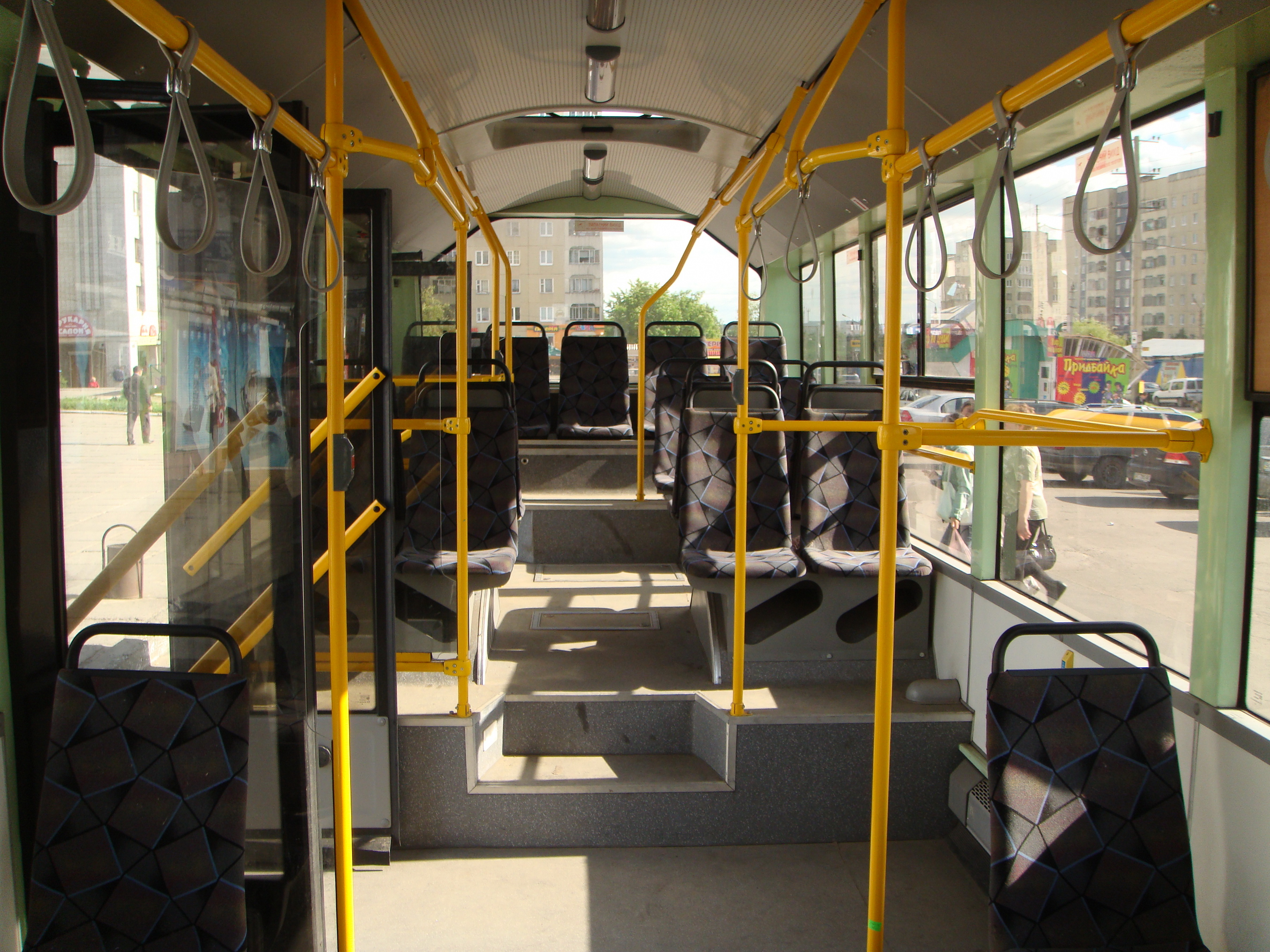
Bogdan A601 interior

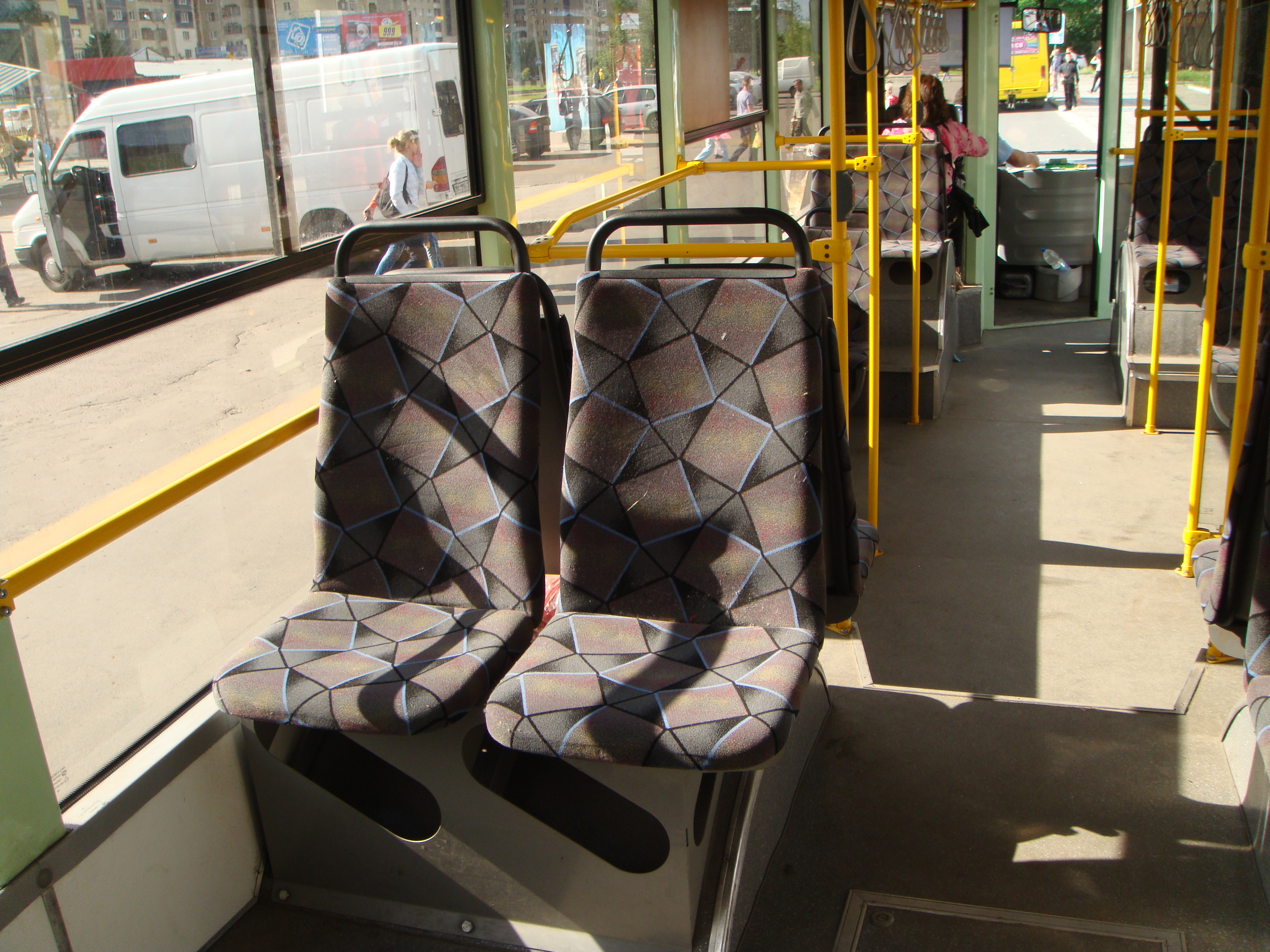
Bogdan A601 interior

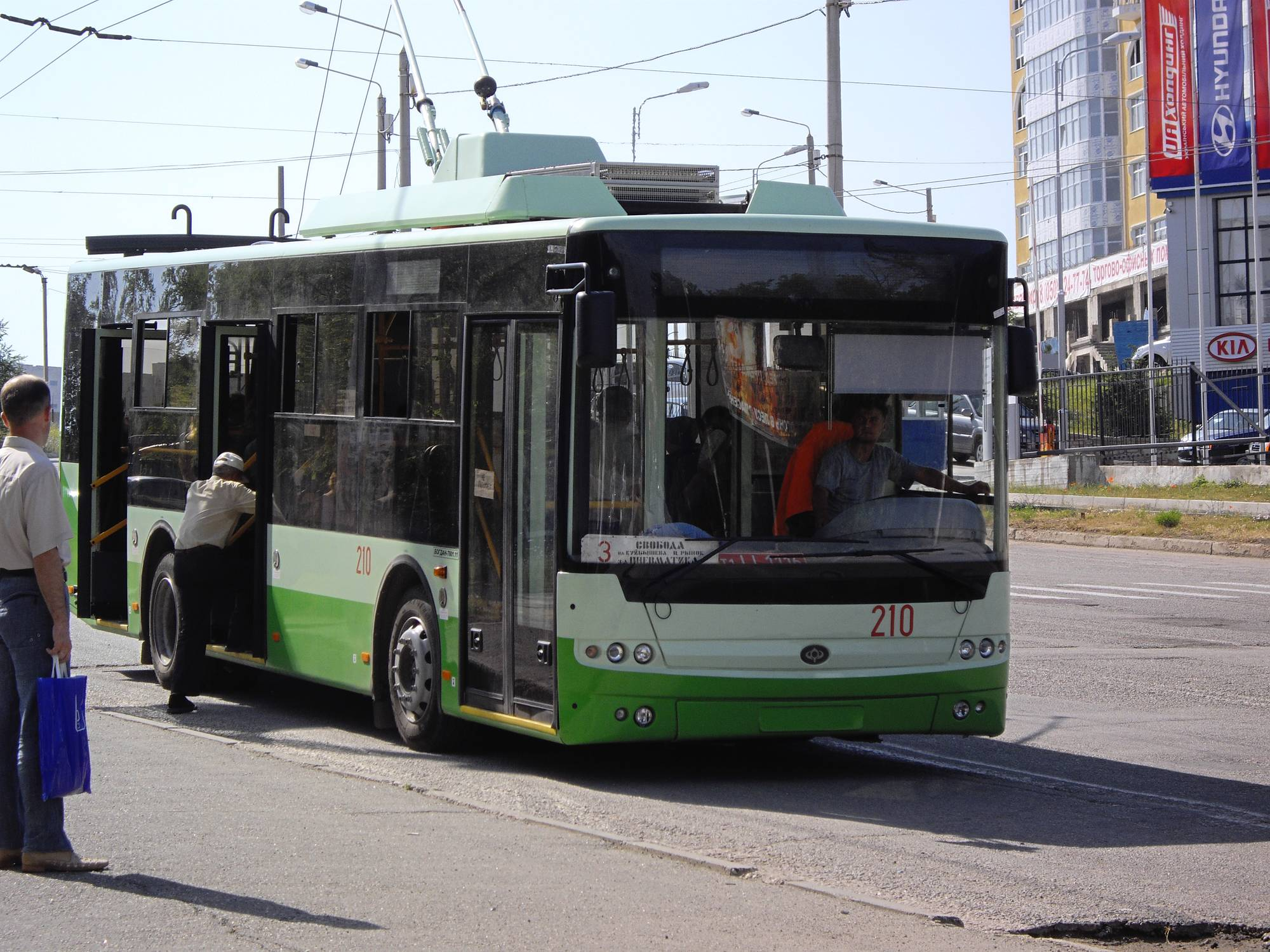
BogdanT601 trolleybus in Simferopol, Crimea, Ukraine

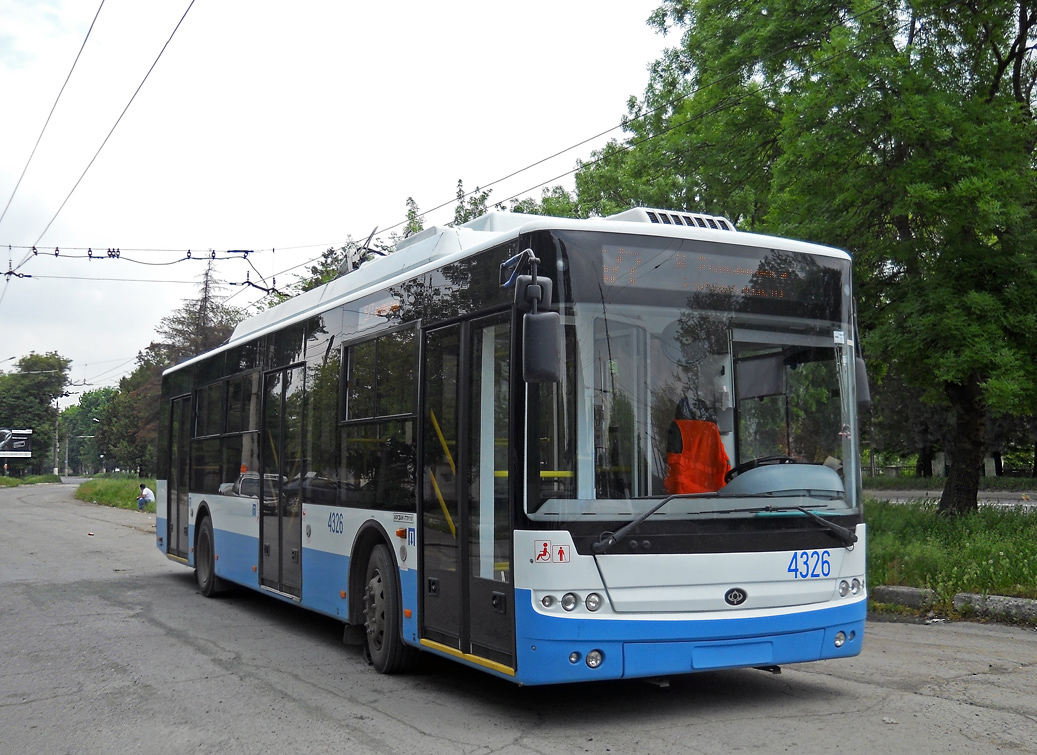
Bogdan T701.10

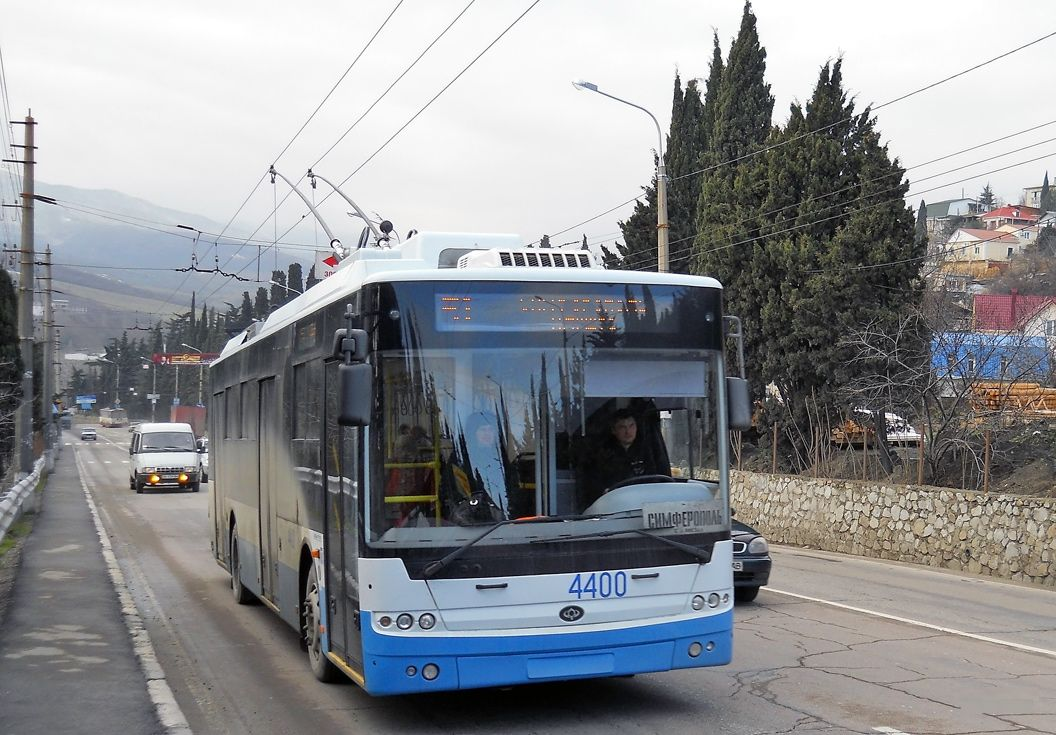
Bogdan T701.15
