= Bogdan A201 =

Ukrainian bus model

Bogdan A201/A221
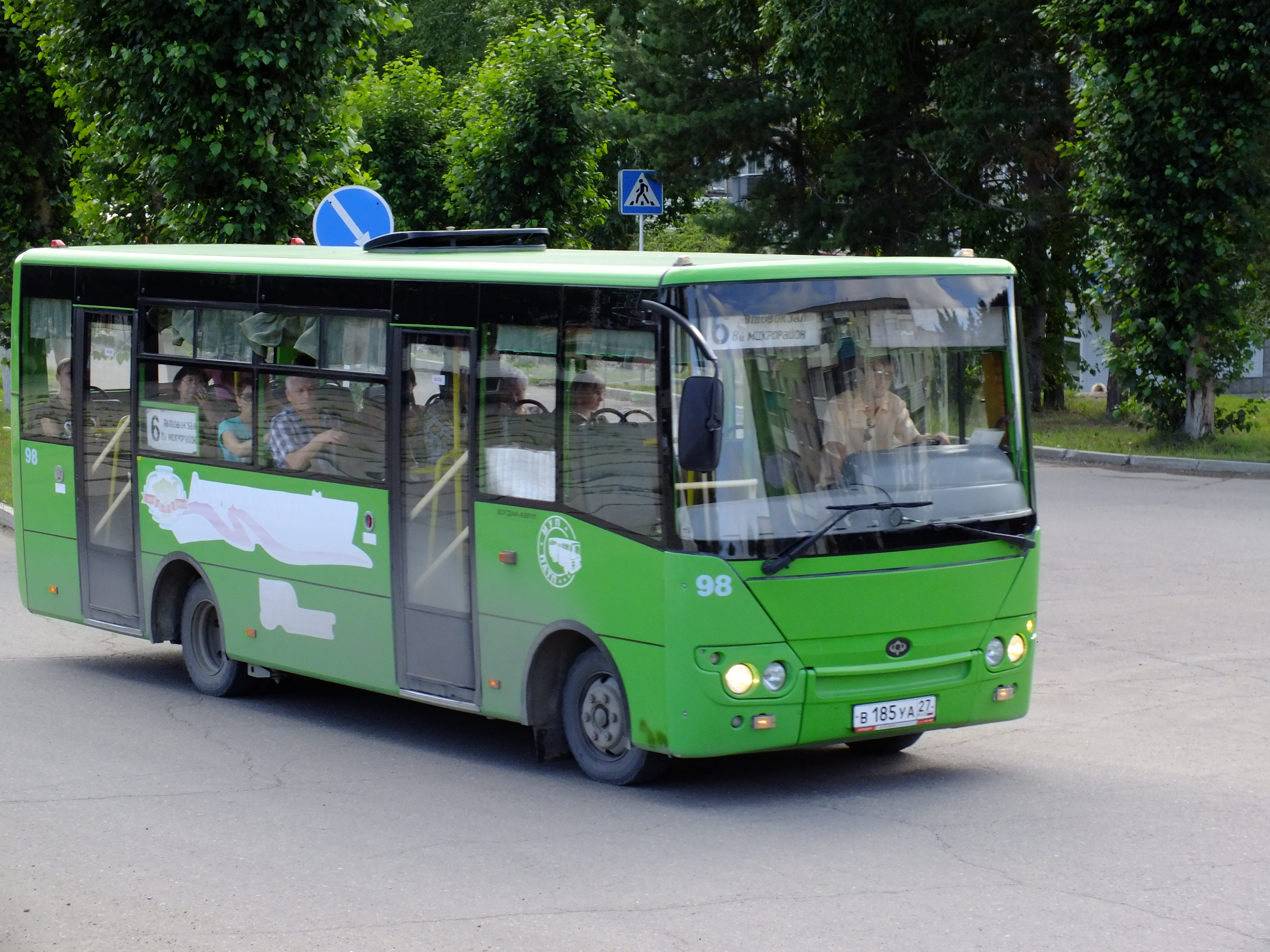
- Bogdan A201 in Amursk

Overview
- Manufacturer: Bogdan (2011–2021); Bus Motor (2021–present)
- Also called: Hyundai County Kuzbas HDU2 (Russia)
- Production: 2011–present
- Assembly: Lutsk, Ukraine (Bogdan ASZ No. 1); Lutsk, Ukraine (Bus Motor)

Body and chassis
- Class: midibus
- Doors: 2
- Floor type: high-floor
- Chassis: Hyundai HD78 (2011–2016); Ashok Leyland (2016–present)

Powertrain
- Engine: Hyundai D4DD (2011–2016); Ashok Leyland H6E4S (2016–present)
- Transmission: Hyundai МО35S5 (2011–2016); Ashok Leyland (2016–present)

Dimensions
- Wheelbase: 4,200 mm (165.4 in)
- Length: 7,880 mm (310.2 in); 8,100 mm (318.9 in)
- Width: 2,300 mm (90.6 in)
- Height: 2,700 mm (106.3 in); 2,780 mm (109.4 in)

Chronology
- Predecessor: Bogdan A092

The Bogdan A221, known as Bogdan A201 until 2016, is a high-floor midibus manufactured by Bogdan Corporation in Ukraine.

== History ==
The financial troubles of the Bogdan Corporation have led them to sell the Cherkasy Bus Plant that had a license to produce an Isuzu-based Bogdan A092 midibus. Being left without their successful model, the corporation had to develop its replacement using different chassis. At the time they were already partners with Hyundai Motor Group that were supplying and selling a smaller Bogdan A069, together with them Bogdan began to develop the new model.

The new bus was presented at TIR-2011 exhibition in Kyiv, it received an index of Bogdan A201, unlike the previous ones it was assembled at Lutsk Automobile Factory, which was one of co-founders of Bogdan. The model was longer than its predecessor, it had a modernized design and glued windows instead of a fixated ones. New buses were equipped with GPS navigation and a bank card payment system.

In 2012–2015 A201 buses were being sold in Russia as Hyundai County Kuzbas HDU2.

In 2016 Bogdan launched the Ashok Leyland-based Bogdan A221. Longer chassis allowed to make a rear entrance wider, making it easier for disabled people to get into the bus. Indian chassis have also allowed to lower the price for a bus although it didn't become the most affordable at the market. Following the announcement, the Hyundai chassis models had been discontinued.

In 2020, during the assembly of a 15 school buses for Volyn Oblast, the model have undergone the facelift, got extended and received the A224 index.

After the bankruptcy of the Lutsk factory in 2021 the model's production was taken over by Bus Motor, Bogdan's former dealer.

During the Russian invasion of Ukraine in 2022 the buses were produced to supply small town schools via state orders.

27 June 2025 Bus Motor launched the Bogdan B22, panel van based on A224 bus. The bus body allowed for more cargo space than in a standard truck.

12 March 2026 it was announced that rest of the lineup will be facelifted and unified with A224.

== Modifications ==
- Bogdan A201 – base model with automatic doors
- Bogdan A202 – intercity variation with one automatic door and one hand-opening door
- Bogdan A204 – school bus with one automatic door and one hand-opening door
- Bogdan A221 – city bus with automatic doors and a wider rear entrance
- Bogdan A222 – longer intercity variation with one automatic door and one hand-opening door
- Bogdan A224 – longer school bus with one automatic door and one hand-opening door
- Bogdan B22 – panel van with side sliding door and rear hand-opening doors

== Gallery ==
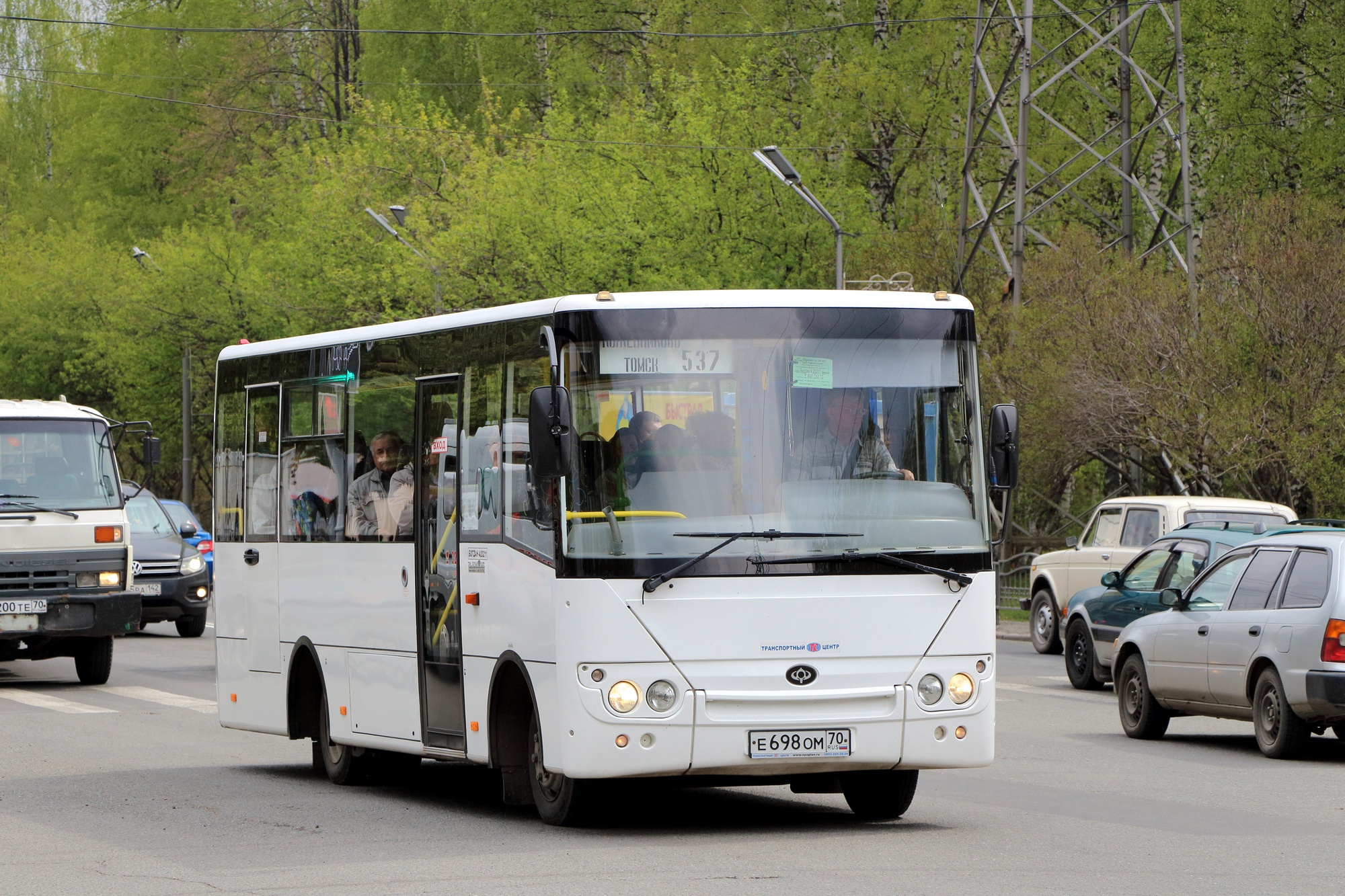
Bogdan A202 in Tomsk

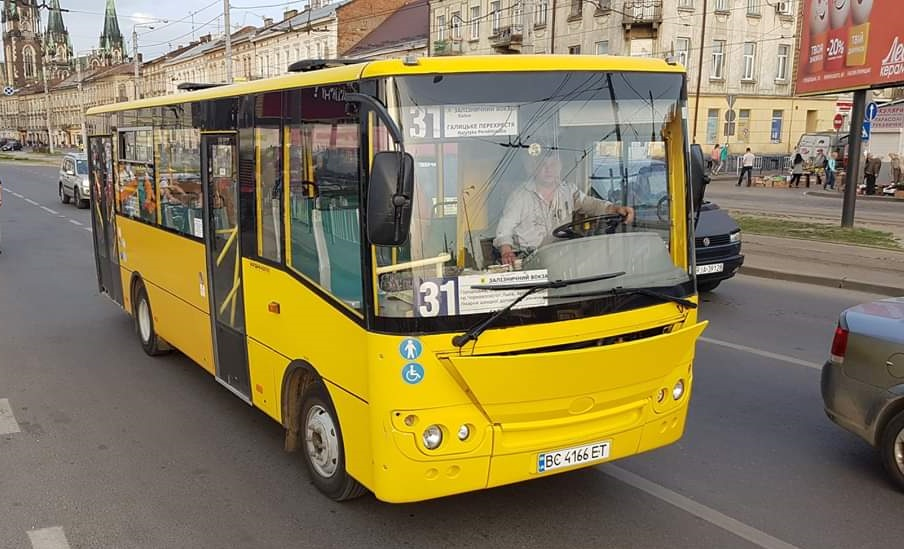
Bogdan A221 in Lviv

== See also ==
- Bogdan (bus model)
