= C8H14O2 =

The molecular formula C_{8}H_{14}O_{2} may refer to:

- Butyl methacrylate
- tert-Butyl methacrylate
- Cypionic acid
- Cyclohexyl acetate
- Frontalin
- Methyl cyclohexanecarboxylate
- Octalactones
  - δ-Octalactone
  - γ-Octalactone
- Polyvinyl butyral (repeating unit)
