= Estradiol hexahydrobenzoate/hydroxyprogesterone caproate/testosterone hexahydrobenzoate =

Combination drug

EHHB/OHPC/THHB
Combination of
- Estradiol hexahydrobenzoate: Estrogen
- Hydroxyprogesterone caproate: Progestogen
- Testosterone hexahydrobenzoate: Androgen; Anabolic steroid

Clinical data
- Trade names: Trinestril AP
- Other names: EHHB/OHPC/THHB
- Routes of administration: Intramuscular injection

Estradiol hexahydrobenzoate/hydroxyprogesterone caproate/testosterone hexahydrobenzoate (EHHB/OHPC/THHB), sold under the brand name Trinestril AP, is an injectable combination medication of estradiol hexahydrobenzoate (EHHB), an estrogen, hydroxyprogesterone caproate (OHPC), a progestogen, and testosterone hexahydrobenzoate (THHB), an androgen/anabolic steroid. It contained 3 mg EHHB, 75 mg OHPC, and 100 mg THHB and was administered by intramuscular injection once per month. The medication was marketed by 1957.

== See also ==
- List of combined sex-hormonal preparations § Estrogens, progestogens, and androgens
