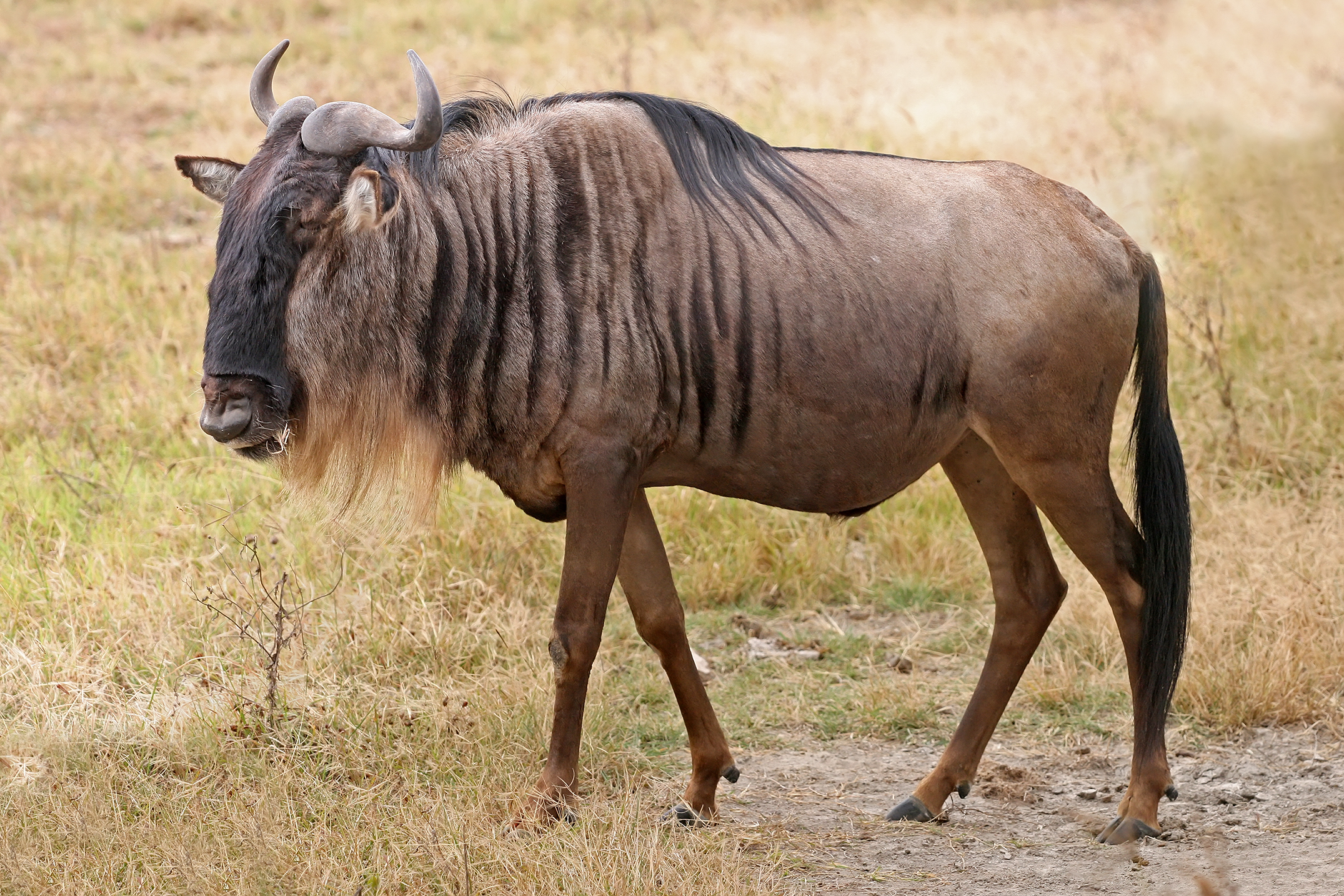
- Blue wildebeest, C. taurinus Ngorongoro Crater, Tanzania
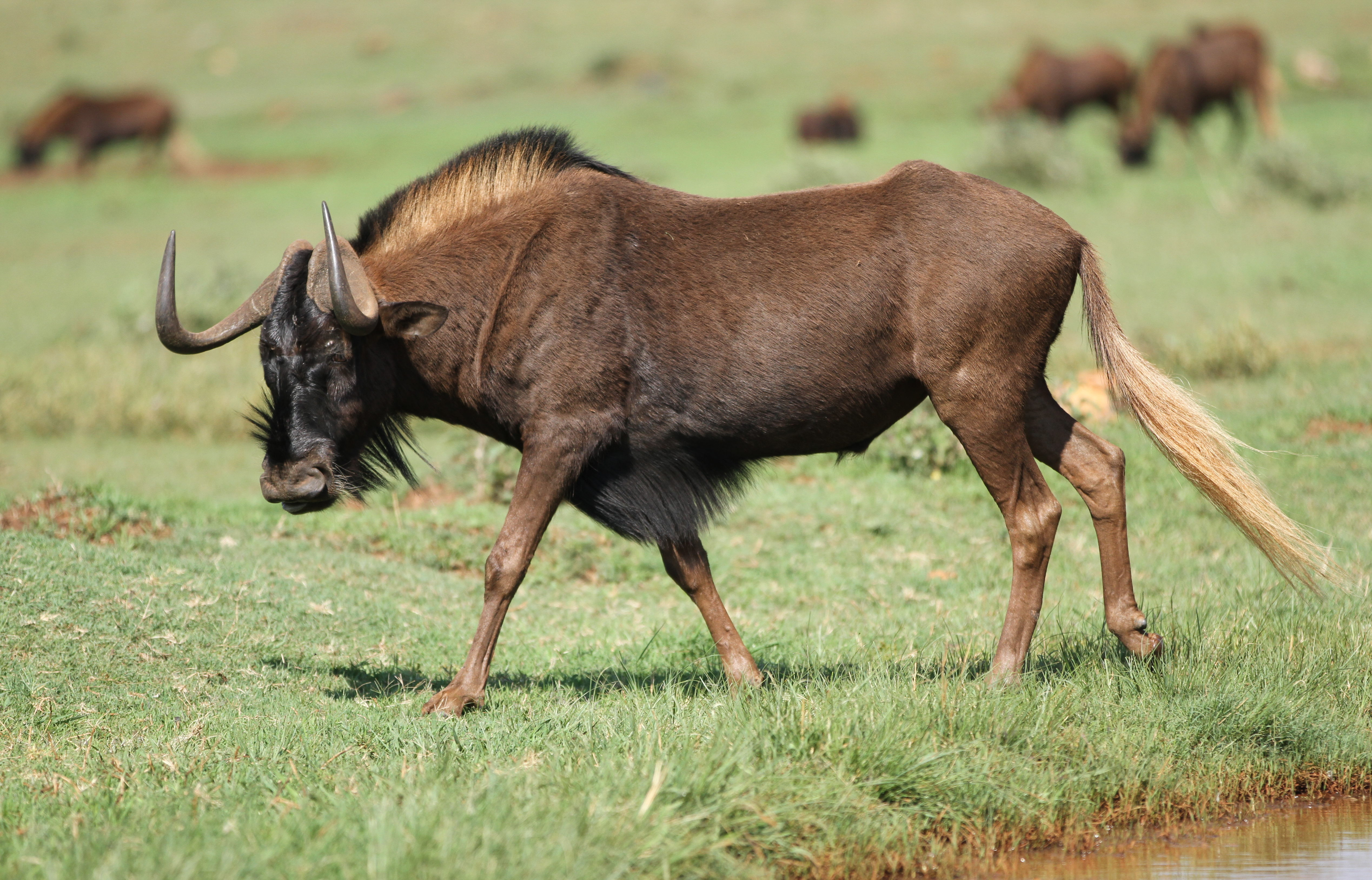
- Black wildebeest, C. gnou Krugersdorp Game Reserve, South Africa

Scientific classification
- Kingdom: Animalia
- Phylum: Chordata
- Class: Mammalia
- Order: Artiodactyla
- Family: Bovidae
- Subfamily: Alcelaphinae
- Genus: Connochaetes; Hinrich Lichtenstein, 1812

Type species
- Antilope gnu

Species
- Connochaetes gnou – black wildebeest Connochaetes taurinus – blue wildebeest
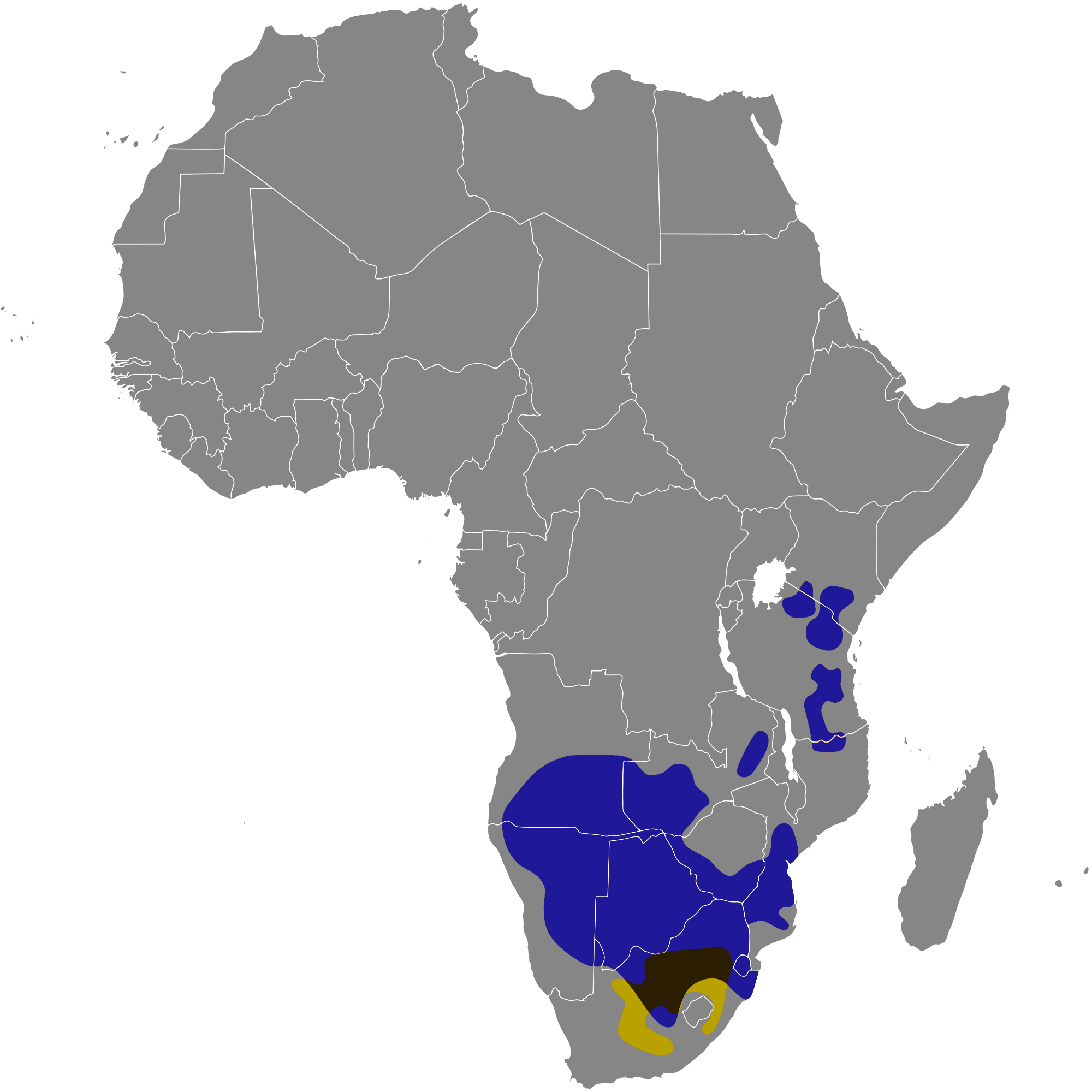
- Range map: Black wildebeest shown yellow Blue wildebeest shown blue Overlapping range shown brown

= Wildebeest =

Wildebeest (or gnu) Temporal range: 2.5–0 Ma Early Pleistocene – present

Genus of antelope

Wildebeest (/ˈwɪl.dɪ.biːst/, WIL-di-beest; /ˈvɪl.-/, VIL-,), also called gnu (/nuː/, NOO or /njuː/, NEW), are antelopes of the genus Connochaetes and native to Eastern and Southern Africa. They belong to the family Bovidae, which includes true antelopes, cattle, goats, sheep, and other even-toed horned ungulates. There are two species of wildebeest: the black wildebeest or white-tailed gnu (C. gnou), and the blue wildebeest or brindled gnu (C. taurinus).

Fossil records suggest these two species diverged about one million years ago, resulting in a northern and a southern species. The blue wildebeest remained in its original range and changed very little from the ancestral species, while the black wildebeest changed more as adaptation to its open grassland habitat in the south. The most obvious ways of telling the two species apart are the differences in their colouring and in the way their horns are oriented.

In East Africa, the blue wildebeest is the most abundant big-game species; some populations perform an annual migration to new grazing grounds, but the black wildebeest is merely nomadic. Breeding in both takes place over a short period of time at the end of the rainy season and the calves are soon active and are able to move with the herd, a fact necessary for their survival. Nevertheless, some fall prey to large carnivores, especially the spotted hyena.

Wildebeest often graze in mixed herds with zebras, which gives heightened awareness of potential predators. They are also alert to the warning signals emitted by other animals such as baboons. Wildebeest are a tourist attraction but compete with domesticated livestock for pasture and are sometimes blamed by farmers for transferring diseases and parasites to their cattle. Illegal hunting does take place but the population trend is fairly stable. Wildebeest can also be found in national parks or on private land. The International Union for Conservation of Nature lists both kinds of wildebeest as least-concern species.

== Etymology ==
Wildebeest is 'wild beast', 'wild ox' or 'wild cattle' in Afrikaans (bees 'cattle'). The name was given by Dutch settlers who saw them on their way to the interior of South Africa in about 1700 because they resemble wild ox. The blue wildebeest was first known to Westerners in the northern part of South Africa a century later, in the 1800s.

Some sources claim the name gnu originates from the Khoekhoe name for these animals, t'gnu. Others contend the name and its pronunciation in English go back to the word !nu: used for the black wildebeest by the San people.

== Classification ==
=== Taxonomy and evolution ===
The genus name Connochaetes derives from the Ancient Greek words κόννος, kónnos 'beard', and χαίτη, khaítē 'flowing hair, mane'. It is placed under the family Bovidae and subfamily Alcelaphinae, where its closest relatives are the hartebeest (Alcelaphus spp.), the hirola (Beatragus hunteri), and species in the genus Damaliscus, such as the topi, the tsessebe, the blesbok and the bontebok. The name Connochaetes was given by German zoologist Hinrich Lichtenstein in 1812.

In the early 20th century, one species of the wildebeest, C. albojubatus, was identified in eastern Africa. In 1914, two separate races of the wildebeest were introduced, namely Gorgon a. albojubatus ("Athi white-bearded wildebeest") and G. a. mearnsi ("Loita white-bearded wildebeest"). However, in 1939, the two were once again merged into a single race, Connochaetes taurinus albojubatus. In the mid-20th century, two separate forms were recognised, Gorgon taurinus hecki and G. t. albojubatus. Finally, two distinct types of wildebeest – the blue and black wildebeest – were identified. The blue wildebeest was at first placed under a separate genus, Gorgon, while the black wildebeest belonged to the genus Connochaetes. Today, they are united in the single genus Connochaetes, with the black wildebeest being named (C. gnou) and the blue wildebeest (C. taurinus).

According to a mitochondrial DNA analysis, the black wildebeest are estimated to have diverged from the main lineage during the Middle Pleistocene and became a distinct species around a million years ago. A divergence rate around 2% has been calculated. The split does not seem to have been driven by competition for resources, but instead because each species adopted a different ecological niche and occupied a different trophic level.

Blue wildebeest fossils dating back some 2.5 million years ago are common and widespread. They have been found in the fossil-bearing caves at the Cradle of Humankind north of Johannesburg. Elsewhere in South Africa, they are plentiful at such sites as Elandsfontein, Cornelia, and Florisbad. The earliest fossils of the black wildebeest were found in sedimentary rock in Cornelia in the Free State and dated back about 800,000 years. Today, five subspecies of the blue wildebeest are recognised, while the black wildebeest has no named subspecies.

=== Genetics and hybrids ===
The diploid number of chromosomes in the wildebeest is 58. Chromosomes were studied in a male and a female wildebeest. In the female, all except a pair of very large submetacentric chromosomes were found to be acrocentric. Metaphases were studied in the male's chromosomes, and very large submetacentric chromosomes were found there, as well, similar to those in the female both in size and morphology. Other chromosomes were acrocentric. The X chromosome is a large acrocentric and the Y chromosome a minute one.

The two species of the wildebeest are known to hybridise. Male black wildebeest have been reported to mate with female blue wildebeest and vice versa. The differences in social behaviour and habitats have historically prevented interspecific hybridisation between the species, but hybridisation may occur when they are both confined within the same area. The resulting offspring are usually fertile. A study of these hybrid animals at Spioenkop Dam Nature Reserve in South Africa revealed that many had disadvantageous abnormalities relating to their teeth, horns, and the wormian bones in the skull. Another study reported an increase in the size of the hybrid as compared to either of its parents. In some animals, the tympanic part of the temporal bone is highly deformed, and in others, the radius and ulna are fused.

=== Characteristics of the species ===
Wildebeest

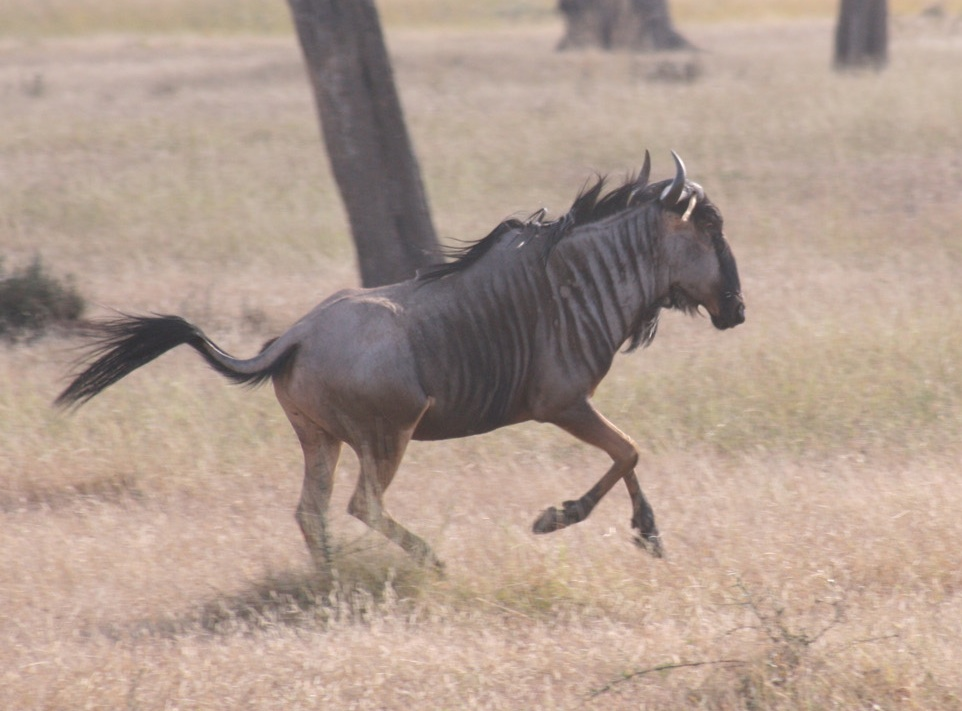
Blue wildebeest

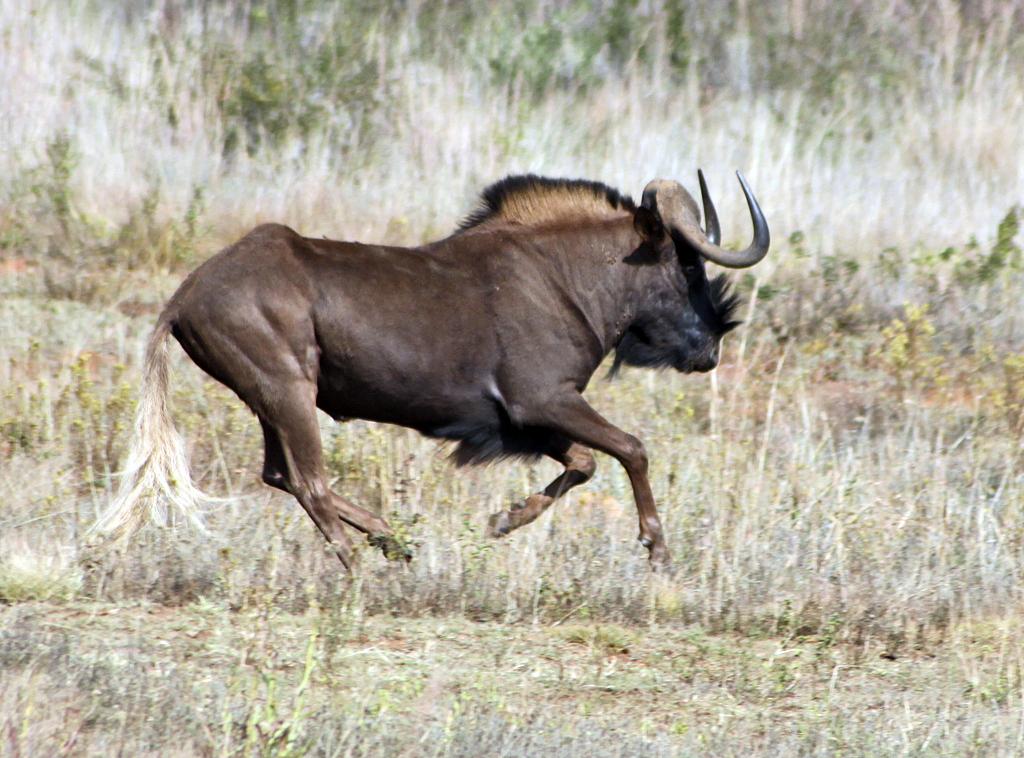
Black wildebeest

Both species of wildebeest are even-toed, horned, greyish-brown ungulates resembling cattle. Males are larger than females and both have heavy forequarters compared to their hindquarters. They have broad muzzles, Roman noses, and shaggy manes and tails. The most striking morphological differences between the black and blue wildebeest are the orientation and curvature of their horns and the colour of their coats. The blue wildebeest is the bigger of the two species. In males, blue wildebeest stand 150 cm (59 in) tall at the shoulder and weigh around 250 kg (550 lb), while the black wildebeest stands 111–120 cm (44–47 in) tall and weighs about 180 kg (400 lb). In females, blue wildebeest have a shoulder height of 135 cm (53 in) and weigh 180 kg (400 lb) while black wildebeest females stand 108 cm (43 in) at the shoulder and weigh 155 kg (342 lb). The horns of blue wildebeest protrude to the side, then curve downwards before curving up back towards the skull, while the horns of the black wildebeest curve forward then downward before curving upwards at the tips. Blue wildebeest tend to be a dark grey colour with stripes, but may have a bluish sheen. The black wildebeest has brown-coloured hair, with a mane that ranges in colour from cream to black, and a cream-coloured tail. The blue wildebeest lives in a wide variety of habitats, including woodlands and grasslands, while the black wildebeest tends to reside exclusively in open grassland areas. In some areas, the blue wildebeest migrates over long distances in the winter, whereas the black wildebeest does not. The milk of the black wildebeest contains a higher protein, lower fat, and lower lactose content than the milk of the blue wildebeest. Wildebeest can live more than 40 years, though their average lifespan is around 20 years.

==== Interdigital glands ====
The wildebeest only has interdigital (hoof) glands in its fore legs. Analysis of chemical constituents from a free ranging blue wildebeest from Zimbabwe (Cawston Block) showed this gland contains cyclohexanecarboxylic acid, phenol, 2-phenylethanol, methyl cyclohexanecarboxylate , and six short-chain carboxylic acids.

== Distribution and habitat ==
Wildebeest inhabit the plains and open woodlands of parts of Africa south of the Sahara. The black wildebeest is native to the southernmost parts of the continent. Its historical range included South Africa, Eswatini, and Lesotho, but in the latter two countries, it was hunted to extinction in the 19th century. It has now been reintroduced to them and also introduced to Namibia, where it has become well established. It inhabits open plains, grasslands, and Karoo shrublands in both steep mountainous regions and lower undulating hills at altitudes varying between 1,350 and 2,150 m (4,430 and 7,050 ft). In the past, it inhabited the highveld temperate grasslands during the dry winter season and the arid Karoo region during the rains. However, as a result of widespread hunting, the black wildebeest no longer occupies its historical range or makes migrations, and is now largely limited to game farms and protected reserves.

The blue wildebeest is native to eastern and southern Africa. Its range includes Kenya, Tanzania, Botswana, Zambia, Zimbabwe, Mozambique, South Africa, Eswatini and Angola. It is no longer found in Malawi but has been successfully reintroduced into Namibia. Blue wildebeest are mainly found in short grass plains bordering bush-covered acacia savannas, thriving in areas that are neither too wet nor too dry. They can be found in habitats that vary from overgrazed areas with dense bush to open woodland floodplains. In East Africa, the blue wildebeest is the most abundant big game species, both in population and biomass. It is a notable feature of the Serengeti National Park in Tanzania, the Maasai Mara National Reserve in Kenya and the Liuwa Plain National Park in Zambia.

=== Migration ===
Migration in wildebeest

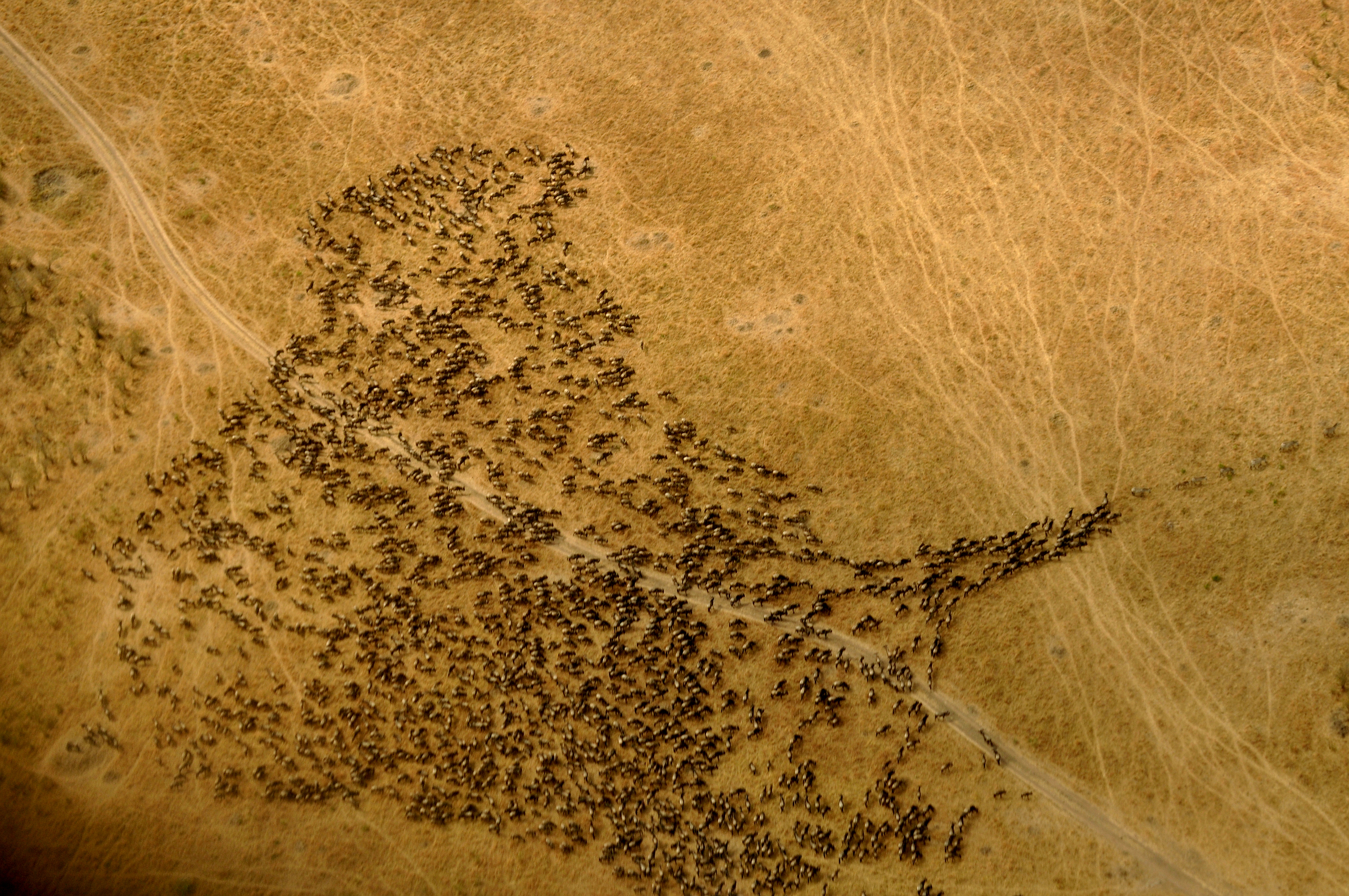
Wildebeest herding and following zebra in the Serengeti National Park

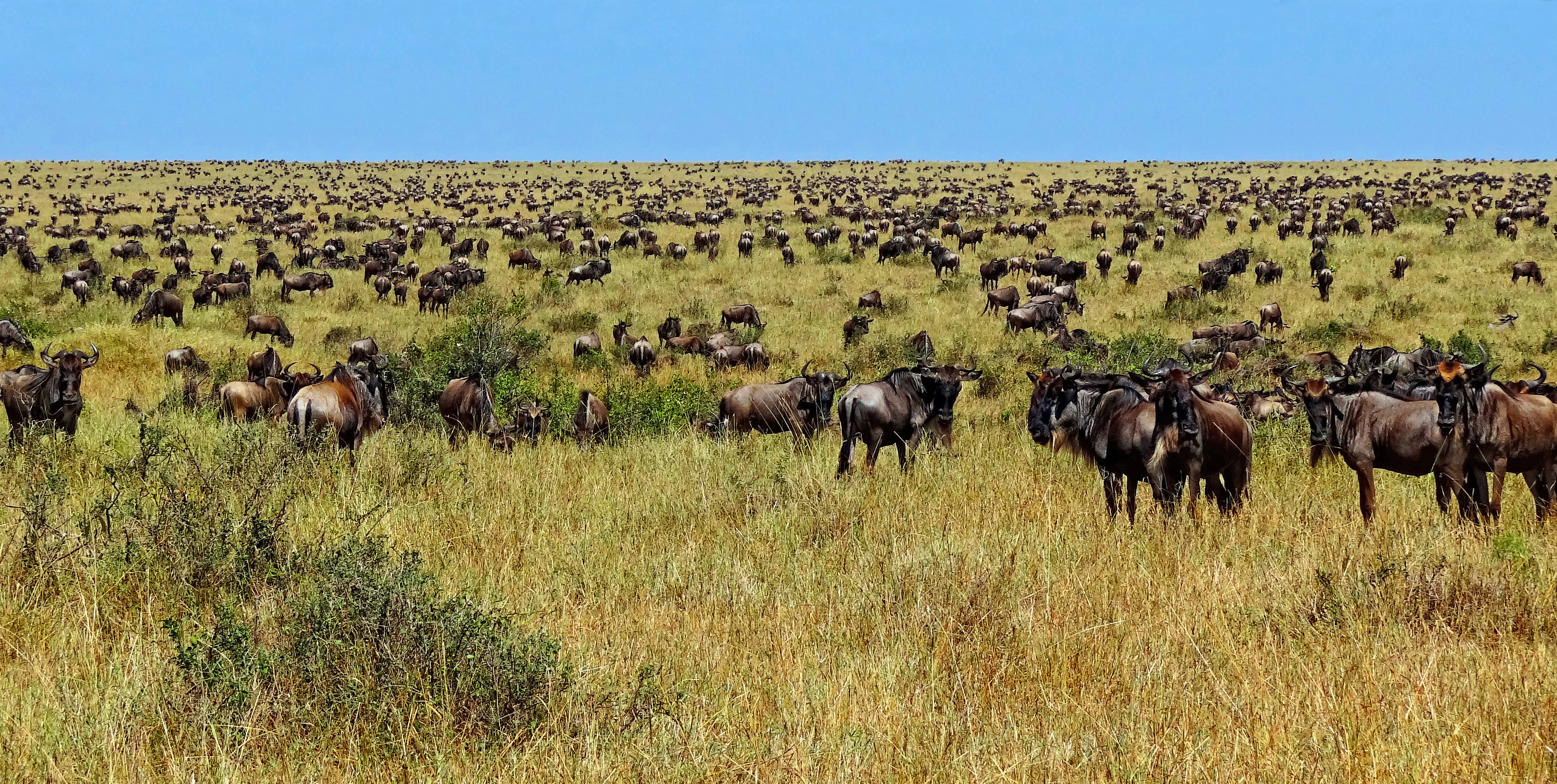
Wildebeest in Masai Mara during the Great Migration

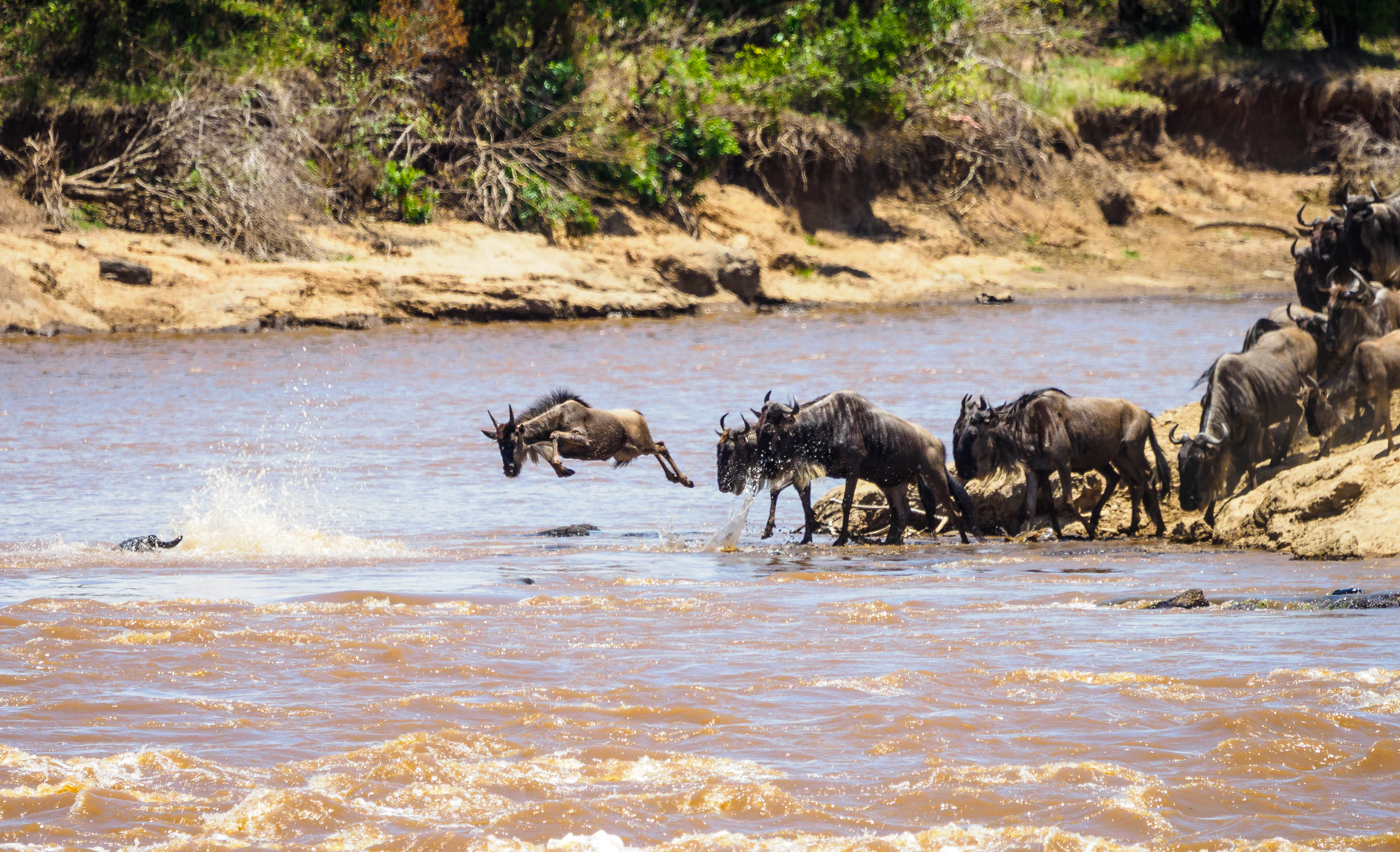
Wildebeest leaping into the Mara River during their Great Migration

Not all wildebeest are migratory. Black wildebeest herds are often nomadic or may have a regular home range of 1 km^{2} (0.39 sq mi). Bulls may occupy territories, usually about 100 to 400 m (300 to 1,300 ft) apart, but this spacing varies according to the quality of the habitat. In favourable conditions, they may be as close as 9 m (30 ft), or they may be as far apart as 1,600 m (5,200 ft) in poor habitat. Female herds have home ranges of about 250 acres (100 ha; 0.39 sq mi) in size. Herds of nonterritorial bachelor males roam at will and do not seem to have any restrictions on where they wander.

Blue wildebeest have both migratory and sedentary populations. In the Ngorongoro, most animals are sedentary and males maintain a network of territories throughout the year, though breeding is seasonal in nature. Females and young form groups of about 10 individuals or join in larger aggregations, and nonterritorial males form bachelor groups. In the Serengeti and Tarangire ecosystems, populations are mostly migratory, with herds consisting of both sexes frequently moving, but resident subpopulations also exist. During the rutting season, the males may form temporary territories for a few hours or a day or so, and attempt to gather together a few females with which to mate, but soon they have to move on, often moving ahead to set up another temporary territory.

In the Maasai Mara game reserve, a non-migratory population of blue wildebeest had dwindled from about 119,000 animals in 1977 to about 22,000 in 1997. The reason for the decline is thought to be the increasing competition between cattle and wildebeest for a diminishing area of grazing land as a result of changes in agricultural practices, and possibly fluctuations in rainfall.

Each year, some East African populations of blue wildebeest have a long-distance migration, seemingly timed to coincide with the annual pattern of rainfall and grass growth. The timing of their migrations in both the rainy and dry seasons can vary considerably (by months) from year to year. At the end of the wet season (May or June in East Africa), wildebeest migrate to dry-season areas in response to a lack of surface (drinking) water. When the rainy season begins again (months later), animals quickly move back to their wet-season ranges. Factors suspected to affect migration include food abundance, surface water availability, predators, and phosphorus content in grasses. Phosphorus is a crucial element for all life forms, particularly for lactating female bovids. As a result, during the rainy season, wildebeest select grazing areas that contain particularly high phosphorus levels. One study found, in addition to phosphorus, wildebeest select ranges containing grass with relatively high nitrogen content.

Aerial photography has revealed that a level of organisation occurs in the movement of the herd that cannot be apparent to each individual animal; for example, the migratory herd exhibits a wavy front, and this suggests that some degree of local decision-making is taking place. Numerous documentaries feature wildebeest crossing rivers, with many being eaten by crocodiles or drowning in the attempt. While having the appearance of a frenzy, recent research has shown a herd of wildebeest possesses what is known as a "swarm intelligence", whereby the animals systematically explore and overcome the obstacle as one.

== Ecology ==
=== Predators ===
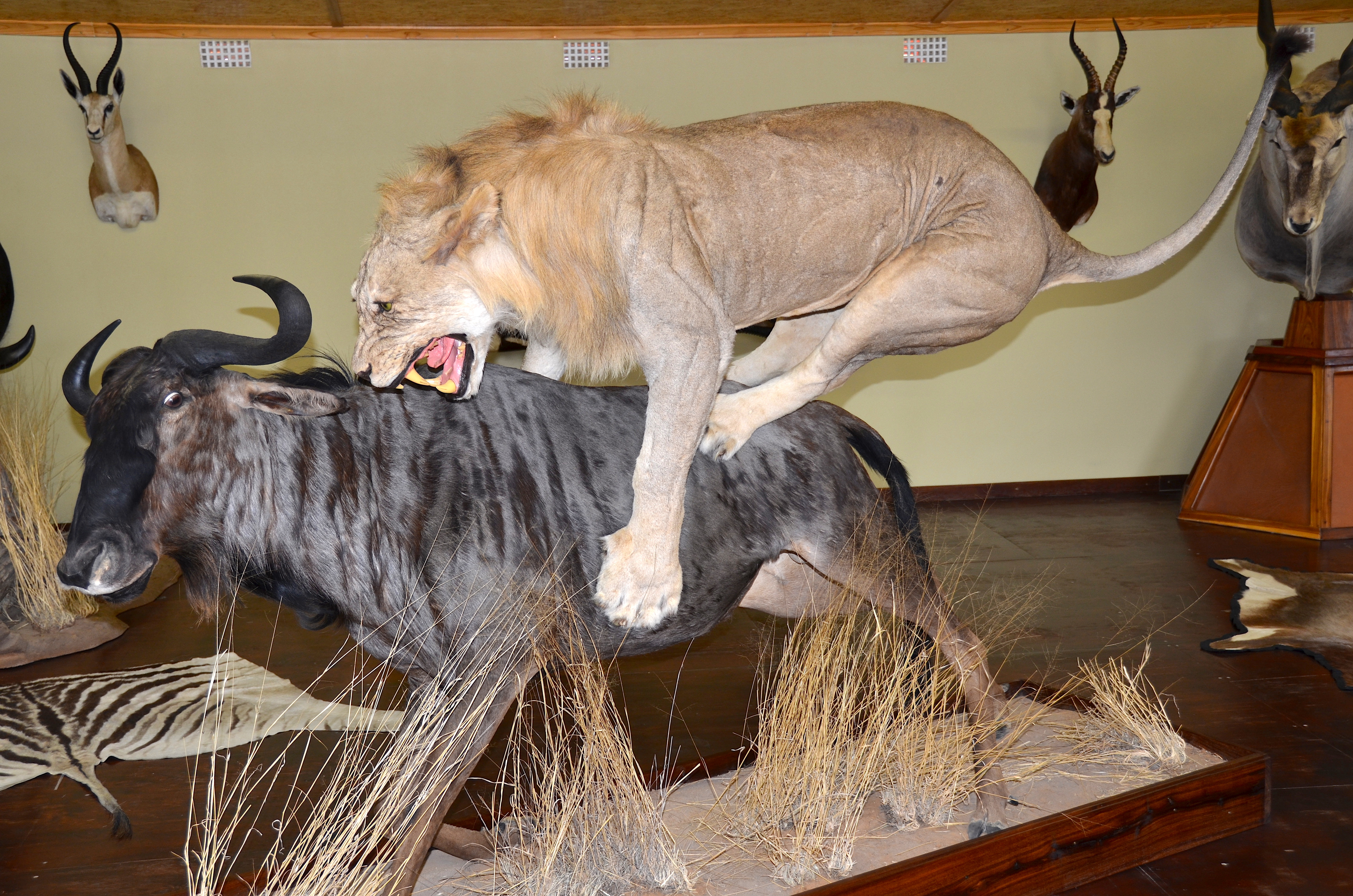
Taxidermied lion and blue wildebeest, Namibia

Major predators that feed on wildebeest include the lion, hyena, African wild dog, cheetah, leopard, and Nile crocodile, which seem to favour the wildebeest over other prey. Wildebeest, however, are very strong, and can inflict considerable injury even to a lion. Wildebeest have a maximum running speed of around 80 km/h (50 mph). The primary defensive tactic is herding, where the young animals are protected by the older, larger ones, while the herd runs as a group. Typically, the predators attempt to isolate a young or ill animal and attack without having to worry about the herd. Wildebeest have developed additional sophisticated cooperative behaviours, such as animals taking turns sleeping while others stand guard against a night attack by invading predators. Wildebeest migrations are closely followed by vultures, as wildebeest carcasses are an important source of food for these scavengers. The vultures consume about 70% of the wildebeest carcasses available. Decreases in the number of migrating wildebeest have also had a negative effect on the vultures. In the Serengeti ecosystem, Tanzania, wildebeest may help facilitate the migration of other, smaller-bodied grazers, such as Thomson's gazelles (Eudorcas thomsonii), which eat the new-growth grasses stimulated by wildebeest foraging.

=== Interactions with nonpredators ===
Zebras and wildebeest group together in open savannah environments with high chances of predation. This grouping strategy reduces predation risk because larger groups decrease each individual's chance of being hunted, and predators are more easily seen in open areas. The seasonal presence of thousands of migratory wildebeests reduces local lion predation on giraffe calves, resulting in greater survival of giraffes.

Wildebeest can also listen in on the alarm calls of other species, and by doing so, can reduce their risk of predation. One study showed, along with other ungulates, wildebeests responded more strongly to the baboon alarm calls compared to the baboon contest calls, though both types of calls had similar patterns, amplitudes, and durations. The alarm calls were a response of the baboons to lions, and the contest calls were recorded when a dispute between two males occurred. Wildebeest compete with domesticated livestock for pasture and are sometimes blamed by farmers for transferring diseases and parasites to their cattle.

=== Breeding and reproduction ===
Video of a wildebeest feeding its calf

Wildebeest do not form permanent pair bonds and during the mating season, or rut, the males establish temporary territories and try to attract females into them. These small territories are about 3,000 square metres (32,000 sq ft; 0.74 acres), with up to 300 territories per 1 square kilometre (0.39 sq mi; 250 acres). The males defend these territories from other males while competing for females that are coming into oestrus. The males use grunts and distinctive behaviour to entice females into their territories. Wildebeest usually breed at the end of the rainy season when the animals are well fed and at their peak of fitness. This usually occurs between May and July, and birthing usually takes place between January and March, at the start of the wet season. Wildebeest females breed seasonally and ovulate spontaneously.

The estrous cycle is about 23 days and the gestation period lasts 250 to 260 days. The calves weigh about 21 kg (46 lb) at birth and scramble to their feet within minutes, being able to move with the herd soon afterwards, a fact on which their survival relies. The main predator of the calves is the spotted hyena. The calving peak period lasts for 2–3 weeks, and in small subpopulations and isolated groups, mortality of calves may be as high as 50%. However, in larger aggregations, or small groups living near large herds, mortality rates may be under 20%.

Groups of wildebeest females and young live in the small areas established by the male. When groups of wildebeest join, the female to male ratio is higher because the females choose to move to the areas held by a smaller number of males. This female-dominated sex ratio may be due to illegal hunting and human disturbance, with higher male mortality having been attributed to hunting.

== Threats and conservation ==
The black wildebeest has been classified as a least-concern species by the International Union for Conservation of Nature in the IUCN Red List. The populations of this species are on an increase. Now, more than 18,000 individuals are believed to remain, 7,000 of which are in Namibia, outside their natural range, and where it is farmed. Around 80% of the wildebeest occurs in private areas, while the other 20% is confined in protected areas. Its introduction into Namibia has been a success and numbers have increased substantially there from 150 in 1982 to 7,000 in 1992.

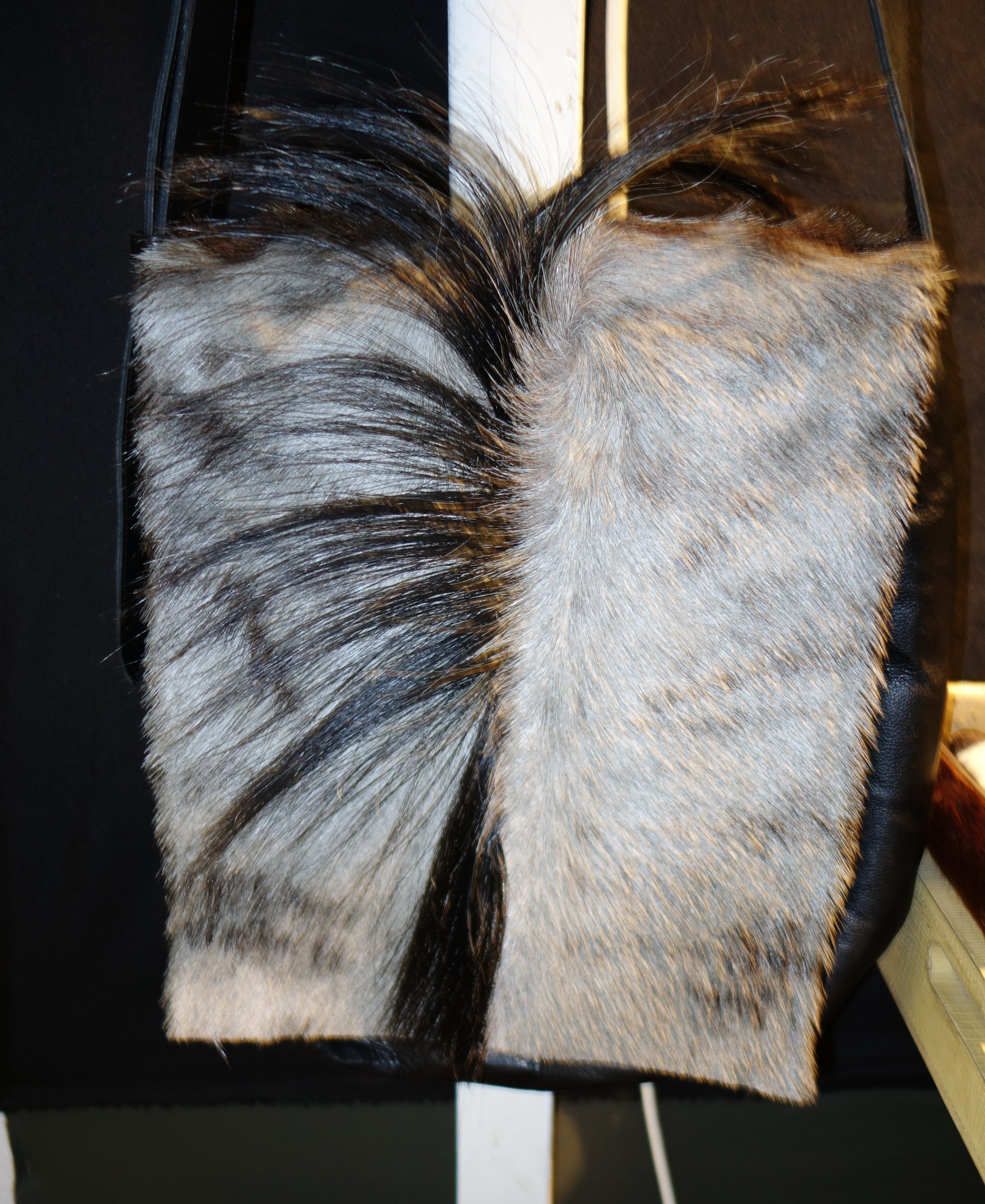
Bag made with wildebeest skin

The blue wildebeest has also been rated as of least concern. The population trend is stable, and their numbers are estimated to be around 1,500,000 – mainly due to the increase of the populations in Serengeti National Park (Tanzania) to 1,300,000 as of 1998. However, the numbers of one of the subspecies, the eastern white-bearded wildebeest (C. t. albojubatus) have seen a steep decline. Population density ranges from 0.15/km^{2}. in Hwange and Etosha National Parks to 35/km^{2} in Ngorongoro Conservation Area and Serengeti National Park.

Overland migration as a biological process requires large, connected landscapes, which are increasingly difficult to maintain, particularly over the long term, when human demands on the landscape compete. The most acute threat comes from migration barriers, such as fences and roads. In one of the more striking examples of the consequences of fence-building on terrestrial migrations, Botswanan authorities placed thousands of kilometres of fences across the Kalahari that prevented wildebeests from reaching watering holes and grazing grounds, resulting in the deaths of tens of thousands of individuals, reducing the wildebeest population to less than 10% of its previous size. Illegal hunting is a major conservation concern in many areas, along with natural threats posed by main predators (which include lions, leopards, African hunting dogs, cheetahs and hyenas). Where the black and blue wildebeest share a common range, the two can hybridise, and this is regarded as a potential threat to the black wildebeest.

== Uses and interaction with humans ==
Wildebeest provide several useful animal products. The hide makes good-quality leather and the flesh is coarse, dry and rather hard. Wildebeest are killed for food, especially to make biltong in Southern Africa. This dried game meat is a delicacy and an important food item in Africa. The meat of females is more tender than that of males, and is the most tender during the autumn season. Wildebeest are a regular target for illegal meat hunters because their numbers make them easy to find. Cooks preparing the wildebeest carcass usually cut it into 11 pieces. The estimated price for wildebeest meat was about US$0.47 per 1 kilogram (2.2 lb) around 2008. The silky, flowing tail of the black wildebeest is used to make fly-whisks or chowries.

Wildebeest benefit the ecosystem by increasing soil fertility with their excreta. They are economically important for human beings, as they are a major tourist attraction. They also provide important products, such as leather, to humans. Wildebeest, however, can also have a negative impact on humans. Wild individuals can be competitors of commercial livestock, and can transmit diseases and cause epidemics among animals, particularly domestic cattle. They can also spread ticks, lungworms, tapeworms, flies, and paramphistome flukes.

=== Cultural depictions ===
The wildebeest is depicted on the coat of arms of the Province of Natal and later KwaZulu-Natal in South Africa. Over the years, the South African authorities have issued several stamps displaying the animal and the South African Mint has struck a two-cent piece with a prancing black wildebeest.

Movies and television shows also feature wildebeests, including Khumba (Mama V), The Wild (Kazar and his minions), All Hail King Julien (Vigman Wildebeest), Phineas and Ferb (Newton the Gnu), The Great Space Coaster (newscaster Gary Gnu), and The Lion King (the wildebeest stampede that resulted in Mufasa's death).

Michael Flanders wrote a humorous song called "The Gnu", which was very popular when he performed it, with Donald Swann, in a revue called At the Drop of a Hat, which opened in London on 31 December 1956.

In the 1970s, British tea brand Typhoo ran a series of television advertisements featuring an animated anthropomorphic gnu character.

The wildebeest is the mascot of the free software project GNU.

The wildebeest is the mascot of the GNU Project and GNU operating system.

In the Llama Llama picture-book series by Anna Dewdney, an anthropomorphised wildebeest named Nelly Gnu is the main character, Llama Llama's best friend, and is also featured in a title of her own, Nelly Gnu and Daddy Too.

In Terry Pratchett's Discworld series, Discworld analogues of wildebeests, which inhabited Howonderland, were called "bewilderbeest".

== See also ==
- Keystone species
