= C25H34O3 =

The molecular formula C_{25}H_{34}O_{3} (molar mass: 382.544 g/mol) may refer to:

- Estradiol hexahydrobenzoate
- Levonorgestrel butanoate
- Trenbolone enanthate
