= Octalactone =

Octalactone may refer to:

- α-Octalactone
- β-Octalactone
- γ-Octalactone
- δ-Octalactone
