= Estradiol hexahydrobenzoate =

Chemical compound

Clinical data
- Trade names: Benzo-Ginoestril A.P., BenzoGynoestryl Retard, Ginestryl-15-Depot, Menodin, Tardoginestryl
- Other names: EHHB; Estradiol cyclohexanecarboxylate; ECHC; Oestradiol hexahydrobenzoate; Estradiol 17β-hexahydrobenzoate; Estradiol 17β-cyclohexanecarboxylate; Estradiol hexabenzoate
- Routes of administration: Intramuscular injection
- Drug class: Estrogen; Estrogen ester

Identifiers
- IUPAC name: (3-hydroxy-13-methyl-6,7,8,9,11,12,14,15,16,17-decahydrocyclopenta[a]phenanthren-17-yl) cyclohexanecarboxylate
- CAS Number: 15140-27-9
- PubChem CID: 85808
- ChemSpider: 77397
- UNII: DI3496530P
- CompTox Dashboard (EPA): DTXSID80934253
- ECHA InfoCard: 100.035.623

Chemical and physical data
- Formula: C_{25}H_{34}O_{3}
- Molar mass: 382.544 g·mol^{−1}
- 3D model (JSmol): Interactive image
- SMILES: CC12CCC3C(CCc4cc(O)ccc34)C1CCC2OC(=O)C5CCCCC5
- InChI: InChI=1S/C25H34O3/c1-25-14-13-20-19-10-8-18(26)15-17(19)7-9-21(20)22(25)11-12-23(25)28-24(27)16-5-3-2-4-6-16/h8,10,15-16,20-23,26H,2-7,9,11-14H2,1H3; Key:IVRCALGRJCHPRV-UHFFFAOYSA-N

Estradiol hexahydrobenzoate (EHHB), sold under a number of brand names including Benzo-Ginoestril A.P., BenzoGynoestryl Retard, Ginestryl-15-Depot, Menodin, and Tardoginestryl, is an estrogen medication which was previously used for indications such as menopausal hormone therapy and gynecological disorders. EHHB is given by injection into muscle at regular intervals, for instance once every few weeks.

Side effects of EHHB include breast tenderness, breast enlargement, nausea, headache, and fluid retention. EHHB is an estrogen and hence is an agonist of the estrogen receptor, the biological target of estrogens like estradiol. It is an estrogen ester and a prodrug of estradiol in the body. Because of this, it is considered to be a natural and bioidentical form of estrogen.

EHHB was first described in 1956, and was introduced for medical use by 1957. It was used in France. The medication should not be confused with estradiol benzoate (EB), which has been marketed under similar brand names including Benzo-Ginestryl, Benzo-Ginoestril, and Benzo-Gynoestryl.

== Medical uses ==
EHHB was marketed in France in a 5 mg/mL oil solution in ampoules for intramuscular injection at regular intervals, for instance once every few weeks. Use of EHHB for feminizing hormone therapy in transgender women has been reported. A combination of 3 mg EHHB, 75 mg hydroxyprogesterone caproate, and 100 mg testosterone hexahydrobenzoate in 2 mL oil solution provided in ampoules has been marketed under the brand name Trinestril AP in Brazil. Its indications include menopausal hormone therapy and the treatment of functional uterine bleeding. The combination is administered typically once per month by intramuscular injection.

== Pharmacology ==
Estradiol, the active form of EHHB.

=== Pharmacodynamics ===
EHHB is an estradiol ester, or a prodrug of estradiol. As such, it is an estrogen, or an agonist of the estrogen receptors. EHHB is of about 40% higher molecular weight than estradiol due to the presence of its C17β cyclohexanecarboxylate ester. Because EHHB is a prodrug of estradiol, it is considered to be a natural and bioidentical form of estrogen.

=== Pharmacokinetics ===
A combination of EHHB and norgestrel as a combined injectable contraceptive reportedly has a duration of action of about 3 weeks.

== Chemistry ==
EHHB, also known as estradiol cyclohexanecarboxylate (ECHC) as well as estradiol 17β-hexahydrobenzoate or estradiol 17β-cyclohexanecarboxylate, is a synthetic estrane steroid and an estrogen ester. It is specifically the C17β cyclohexanecarboxylate (hexahydrobenzoate) ester of estradiol.

== History ==
EHHB was first described and characterized in 1956. It was developed in France. The medication was introduced for medical use in France by 1957. A publicized case report of a rapidly growing breast cancer tumor in a 53-year-old woman 10 days after initiation of therapy with 5 mg/month EHHB by intramuscular injection for hot flashes was published in 1962. The woman died due to breast cancer 10 months after the diagnosis.

== Society and culture ==
=== Generic names ===
Estradiol hexahydrobenzoate is the generic name of the drug and its INN), while oestradiol hexahydrobenzoate is its BANM. The medication is also known as estradiol cyclohexanecarboxylate (ECHC).

=== Brand names ===
EHHB has been marketed under the brand names Benzo-Ginoestril A.P., BenzoGynoestryl Retard, Ginestryl-15-Depot, Menodin, and Tardoginestryl.

=== Availability ===
EHHB was previously marketed in France.

== Research ==
A combination of 5 mg EHHB in peanut oil solution and 25 mg norgestrel in aqueous suspension as a once-monthly combined injectable contraceptive was studied, but this formulation was ultimately never marketed.
