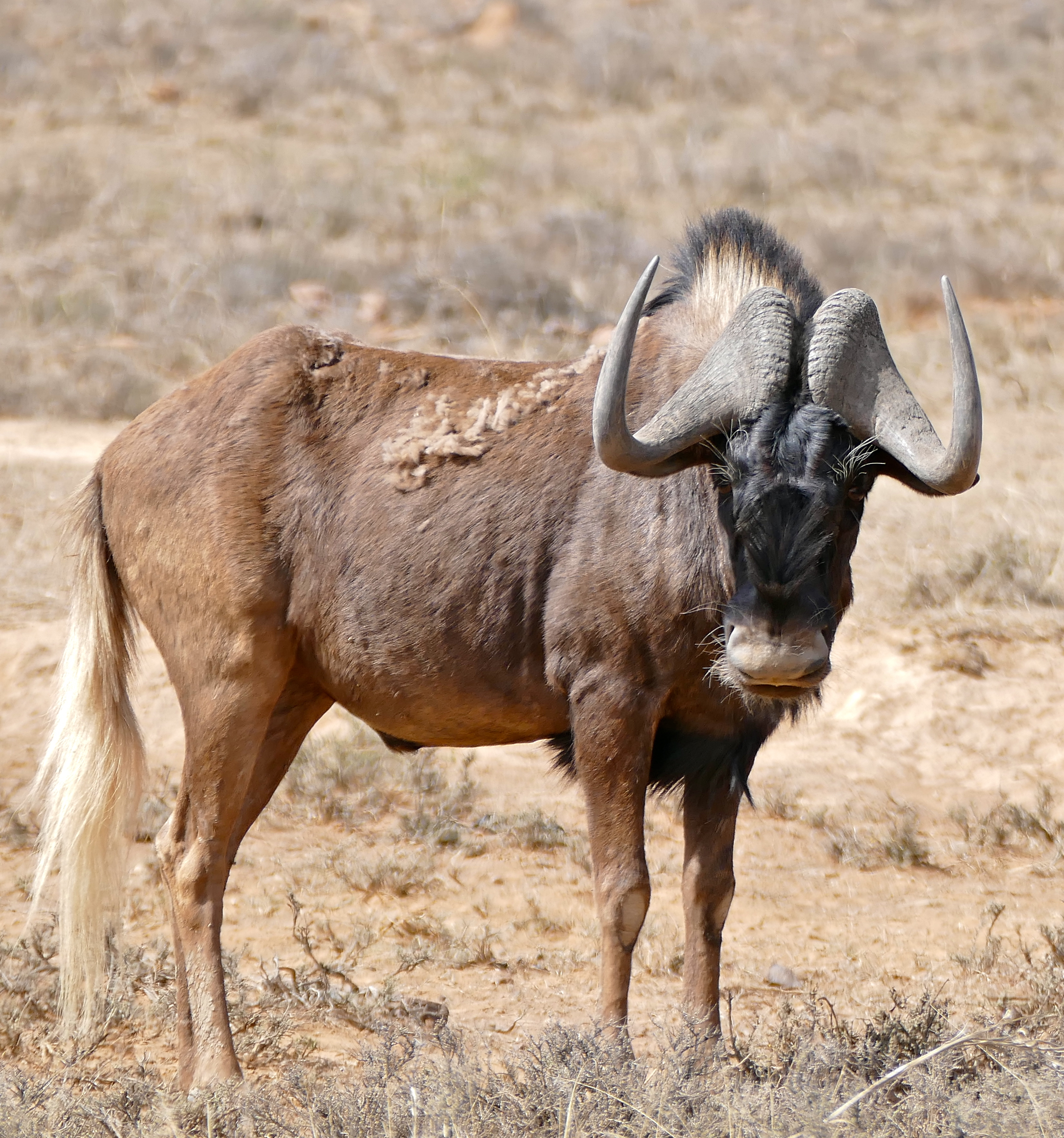
- Black wildebeest in Mountain Zebra National Park, South Africa

Conservation status
- Least Concern (IUCN 3.1)

Scientific classification
- Kingdom: Animalia
- Phylum: Chordata
- Class: Mammalia
- Order: Artiodactyla
- Family: Bovidae
- Subfamily: Alcelaphinae
- Genus: Connochaetes
- Species: C. gnou

Binomial name
- Connochaetes gnou (Zimmermann, 1780)
- Distribution range

Synonyms
- Bos gnou (Zimmermann, 1777); Antilope capensis (Gatterer, 1780); Antilope gnou (Zimmermann, 1780); Antilope gnu (Gmelin, 1788); Catoblepas operculatus (Brookes, 1828); Bos connochaetes (Forster, 1844)

= Black wildebeest =

Black wildebeest Temporal range: 1–0 Ma Middle Pleistocene – present

Species of mammal

The black wildebeest or white-tailed gnu (Connochaetes gnou) is one of the two closely related wildebeest species. It is a member of the genus Connochaetes and family Bovidae. It was first described in 1780 by Eberhard August Wilhelm von Zimmermann. The black wildebeest is typically 1.7–2.2 m (5 ft 7 in – 7 ft 3 in) in head-and-body length, and the typical weight is 110–180 kg (240–400 lb). Males stand about 1.11–1.21 m (3 ft 8 in – 4 ft 0 in) at the shoulder, while the height of the females is 1.06–1.16 m (3 ft 6 in – 3 ft 10 in). The black wildebeest is characterised by its white, long, horse-like tail. It also has a dark brown to black coat and long, dark-coloured hair between its forelegs and under its belly.

The black wildebeest is an herbivore, and almost the whole diet consists of grasses. Water is an essential requirement. The three distinct social groups are the female herds, the bachelor herds, and the territorial bulls. They are fast runners and communicate using a variety of visual and vocal communications. The primary breeding season for the black wildebeest is from February to April. A single calf is usually born after a gestational period of about 8.5 months. The calf remains with its mother until her next calf is born a year later. The black wildebeest inhabits open plains, grasslands, and karoo shrublands.

The natural populations of black wildebeest, endemic in the southern part of Africa, were almost completely exterminated in the 19th century, due to their reputation as pests and the value of their hides and meat, but the species has been reintroduced widely from captive specimens, both in private areas and nature reserves throughout most of Lesotho, Eswatini, and South Africa. The species has also been introduced outside its natural range in Namibia and Kenya.

== Taxonomy and evolution ==
The scientific name of the black wildebeest is Connochaetes gnou. The animal is placed in the genus Connochaetes and family Bovidae and was first described by German zoologist Eberhard August Wilhelm von Zimmermann in 1780. He based his description on an article written by natural philosopher Jean-Nicolas-Sébastien Allamand in 1776. The generic name Connochaetes derives from the Greek words κόννος, kónnos, "beard", and χαίτη, khaítē, "flowing hair", "mane". The specific name gnou originates from the Khoekhoe name for these animals, gnou. The common name "gnu" is also said to have originated from the Khoekhoe name t'gnu, which refers to the repeated calls of "ge-nu" by the bull in the mating season. The black wildebeest was first discovered in the northern part of South Africa in the 1800s.

The black wildebeest is currently included in the same genus as the blue wildebeest (Connochaetes taurinus). This has not always been the case, and at one time the latter was placed under a genus of its own, Gorgon. The black wildebeest lineage seems to have diverged from the blue wildebeest in the mid- to late Pleistocene, and became a distinct species around a million years ago. This evolution is quite recent on a geologic time scale.

Features necessary for defending a territory, such as the horns and broad-based skull of the modern black wildebeest, have been found in their fossil ancestors. The earliest known fossil remains are in sedimentary rock in Cornelia in the Free State and date back about 800,000 years. Fossils have also been reported from the Vaal River deposits, though whether or not they are as ancient as those found in Cornelia is unclear. Horns of the black wildebeest have been found in sand dunes near Hermanus in South Africa. This is far beyond the recorded range of the species and these animals may have migrated to that region from the karoo.

=== Hybrids ===
The black wildebeest is known to hybridise with its taxonomically close relative, the blue wildebeest. Male black wildebeest have been reported to mate with female blue wildebeest and vice versa. The differences in social behaviour and habitats have historically prevented interspecific hybridisation, but it may occur when they are both confined within the same area. The resulting offspring is usually fertile. A study of these hybrid animals at Spioenkop Dam Nature Reserve in South Africa revealed that many had disadvantageous abnormalities relating to their teeth, horns, and the wormian bones in the skull. Another study reported an increase in the size of the hybrid as compared to either of its parents. In some animals, the auditory bullae are highly deformed, and in others, the radius and ulna are fused.

== Description ==
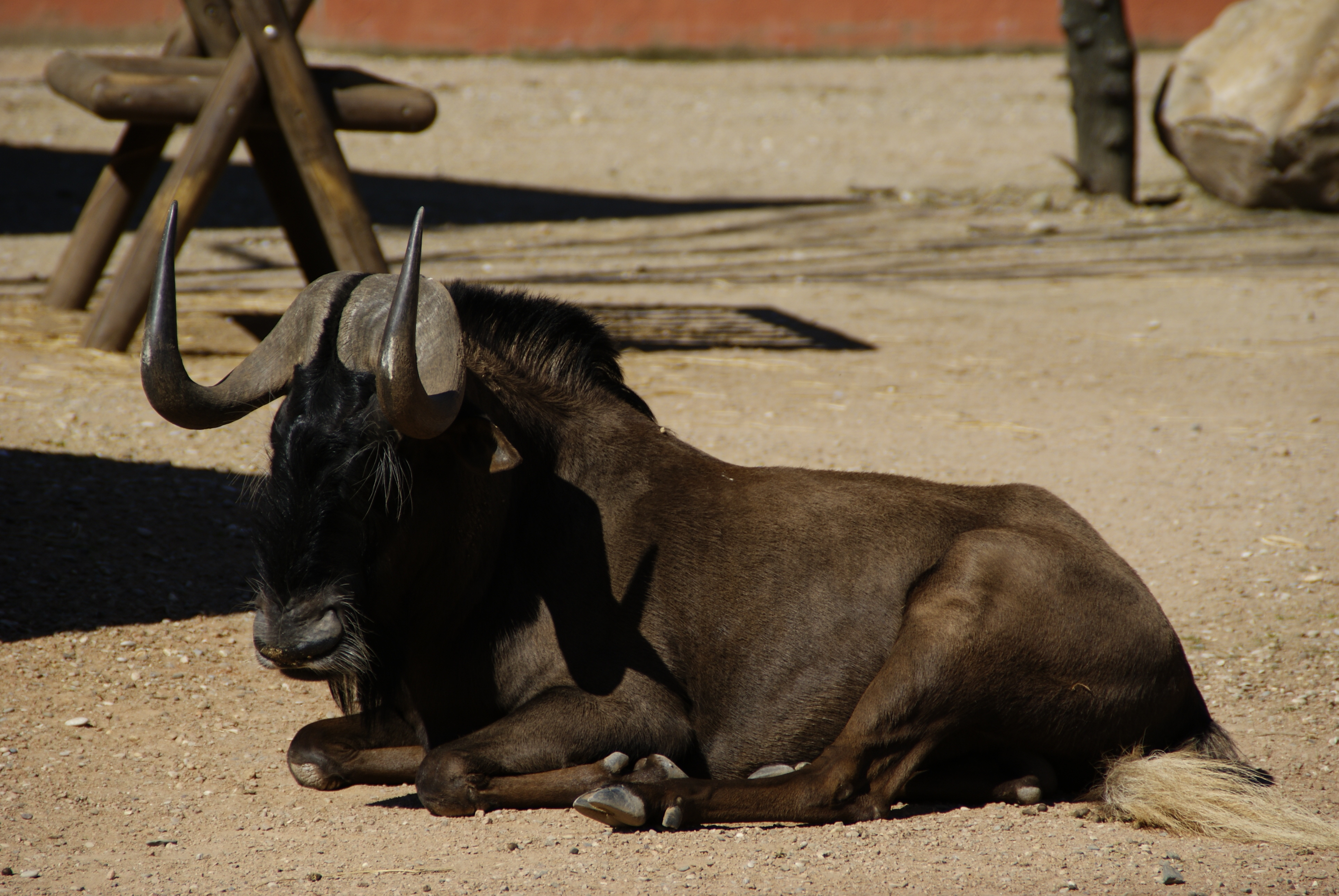
The black wildebeest has horns that curve forward.

Black wildebeest are sexually dimorphic, with females being shorter and slenderer than males. The head-and-body length is typically between 1.7 and 2.2 m (5 ft 7 in and 7 ft 3 in). Bulls reach about 1.11 to 1.21 m (3 ft 8 in to 4 ft 0 in) at the shoulder, while cows reach 1.06 to 1.16 m (3 ft 6 in to 3 ft 10 in). Bulls typically weigh 140 to 157 kg (309 to 346 lb) and cows 110 to 122 kg (243 to 269 lb). A distinguishing feature in both sexes is the tail, which is long and similar to that of a horse. Its bright-white colour gives this animal the vernacular name of "white-tailed gnu", and also distinguishes it from the blue wildebeest, which has a black tail. The length of the tail ranges from 80 to 100 cm (2.6 to 3.3 ft).

The black wildebeest has a dark brown or black coat, which is slightly paler in summer and coarser and shaggier in the winter. Calves are born with shaggy, fawn-coloured fur. Males are darker than females. They have bushy and dark-tipped manes that, as in the blue wildebeest, stick up from the back of the neck. The hairs that compose this are white or cream-coloured with dark tips. On its muzzle and under its jaw, it has black bristly hair. It also has long, dark-coloured hair between its forelegs and under its belly. Other physical features include a thick neck, a plain back, and rather small and beady eyes.

Both sexes have strong horns that curve forward, resembling hooks, which are up to 78 cm (31 in) long. The horns have a broad base in mature males, and are flattened to form a protective shield. In females, the horns are both shorter and narrower. They become fully developed in females in the third year, while horns are fully grown in males aged four or five. The black wildebeest normally has 13 thoracic vertebrae, though specimens with 14 have been reported, and this species shows a tendency for the thoracic region to become elongated. Scent glands secrete a glutinous substance in front of the eyes, under the hair tufts, and on the forefeet. Females have two teats. Apart from the difference in the appearance of the tail, the two species of wildebeests also differ in size and colour, with the black being smaller and darker than the blue.

The black wildebeest can maintain its body temperature within a small range in spite of large fluctuations in external temperatures. It shows well-developed orientation behaviour towards solar radiation, which helps it thrive in hot, and often shadeless, habitats. The erythrocyte count is high at birth and increases till the age of 2–3 months, while in contrast, the leucocyte count is low at birth and falls throughout the animal's life. The neutrophil count is high at all ages. The haematocrit and haemoglobin content decreases till 20–30 days after birth. A peak in the content of all these haemological parameters occurs at the age of 2–3 months, after which the readings gradually decline, reaching their lowest values in the oldest individuals. The presence of fast-twitch fibres and the ability of the muscles to use large amounts of oxygen help explain the rapid running speed of the black wildebeest and its high resistance to fatigue. Individuals may live for about 20 years.

== Diseases and parasites ==
The black wildebeest is particularly susceptible to anthrax, and rare and widely scattered outbreaks have been recorded and have proved deadly. Ataxia related to myelopathy and low copper concentrations in the liver have also been seen in the black wildebeest. Heartwater (Ehrlichia ruminantium) is a tick-borne rickettsial disease that affects the black wildebeest, and as the blue wildebeest is fatally affected by rinderpest and foot-and-mouth disease, it is also likely to be susceptible to these. Malignant catarrhal fever is a fatal disease of domestic cattle caused by a gammaherpesvirus. Like the blue wildebeest, the black wildebeest seems to act as a reservoir for the virus and all animals are carriers, being persistently infected, but showing no symptoms. The virus is transmitted from mother to calf during the gestation period or soon after birth.

Black wildebeest act as hosts to a number of external and internal parasites. A study of the animal in Karroid Mountainveld (Eastern Cape Province, South Africa) revealed the presence of all the larval stages of the nasal bot flies Oestrus variolosus and Gedoelstia hässleri. The first-instar larvae of G. hässleri were found in large numbers on the dura mater of wildebeest calves, specially between June and August, and these later migrated to the nasal passages. Repeated outbreaks of mange (scab) have led to large-scale extinctions. The first study of the protozoa in blue and black wildebeest showed the presence of 23 protozoan species in the rumen, with Diplodinium bubalidis and Ostracodinium damaliscus common in all the animals.

== Ecology and behavior ==
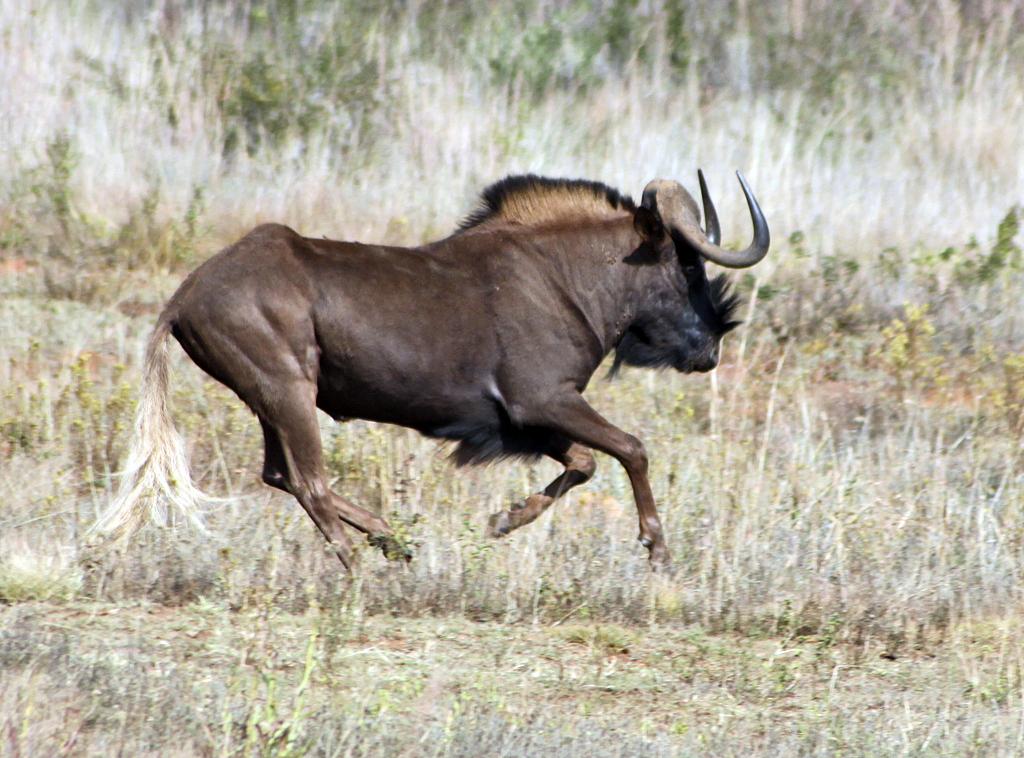
Black wildebeest can run at speeds up to 80 km/h (50 mph)

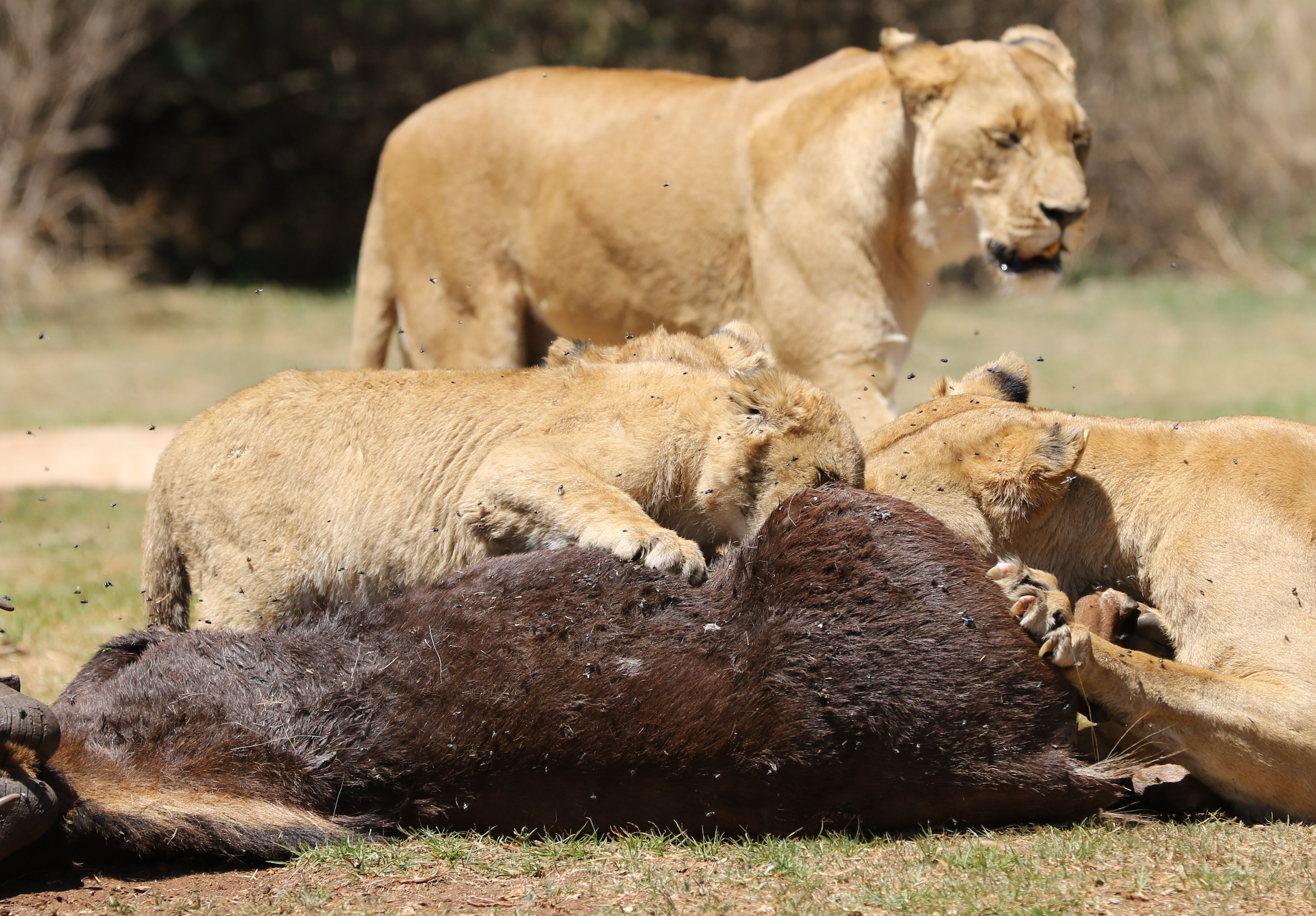
Lions feeding off a carcass of a black wildebeest at Krugersdorp Game Park in Gauteng, South Africa

Black wildebeest are mainly active during the early morning and late afternoon, preferring to rest during the hottest part of the day. The animals can run at speeds of 80 km/h (50 mph). When a person approaches a herd to within a few hundred metres, the wildebeest snort and run a short distance before stopping and looking back, repeating this behaviour if further approached. They communicate with each other using pheromones detected by flehmen and several forms of vocal communication. One of these is a metallic snort or an echoing "hick", that can be heard up to 1.5 km (1 mi) away. They are preyed on by the lion, spotted hyena, Cape hunting dog, leopard, cheetah, and Nile crocodile. Of these, the calves are targeted mainly by the hyenas, while lions attack the adults.

The black wildebeest is a gregarious animal with a complex social structure comprising three distinct groups, the female herds consisting of adult females and their young, the bachelor herds consisting only of yearlings and older males, and territorial bulls. The number of females per herd is variable, generally ranging from 14 to 32, but is highest in the densest populations and also increases with forage density. A strong attachment exists among members of the female herd, many of which are related to each other. Large herds often get divided into smaller groups. While small calves stay with their mothers, the older ones form groups of their own within the herd. These herds have a social hierarchy, and the females are rather aggressive towards others trying to join the group. Young males are generally repelled by their mothers before the calving season starts. Separation of a young calf from its mother can be a major cause of calf mortality. While some male yearlings stay within the female herd, the others join a bachelor herd. These are usually loose associations, and unlike the female herds, the individuals are not much attached to each other. Another difference between the female and bachelor herds is the lesser aggression on the part of the males. These bachelor herds move widely in the available habitat and act as a refuge for males that have been unsuccessful as territorial bulls, and also as a reserve for future breeding males.

Mature bulls, generally more than 4 years old, set up their own territories through which female herds often pass. These territories are maintained throughout the year, with animals usually separated by a distance around 100–400 m (330–1,310 ft), but this can vary according to the quality of the habitat. In favourable conditions, this distance is as little as 9 m (30 ft), but can be as large as 1.6 km (0.99 mi) in poor habitat. Each bull has a patch of ground in the centre of his territory in which he regularly drops dung, and in which he performs acts of display. These include urinating, scraping, pawing, and rolling on the ground and thumping it with his horns - all of which demonstrate his prowess to other bulls. An encounter between two bulls involves elaborate rituals. Estes coined the term "challenge ritual" to describe this behaviour for the blue wildebeest, but this is also applicable to the black wildebeest, owing to their close similarity in behavior. The bulls approach each other with their heads lowered, resembling a grazing position (sometimes actually grazing). This is usually followed by movements such as standing in a reverse-parallel position, in which one male urinates and the opponent smells and performs flehmen, after which they may reverse the procedure. During this ritual or afterwards, the two can toss their horns at each other, circle one another, or even look away. Then begins the fight, which may be of low intensity (consisting of interlocking the horns and pushing each other in a standing position) or high intensity (consisting of their dropping to their knees and straining against each other powerfully, trying to remain in contact while their foreheads are nearly touching the ground). Threat displays such as shaking the head may also take place.

=== Diet ===
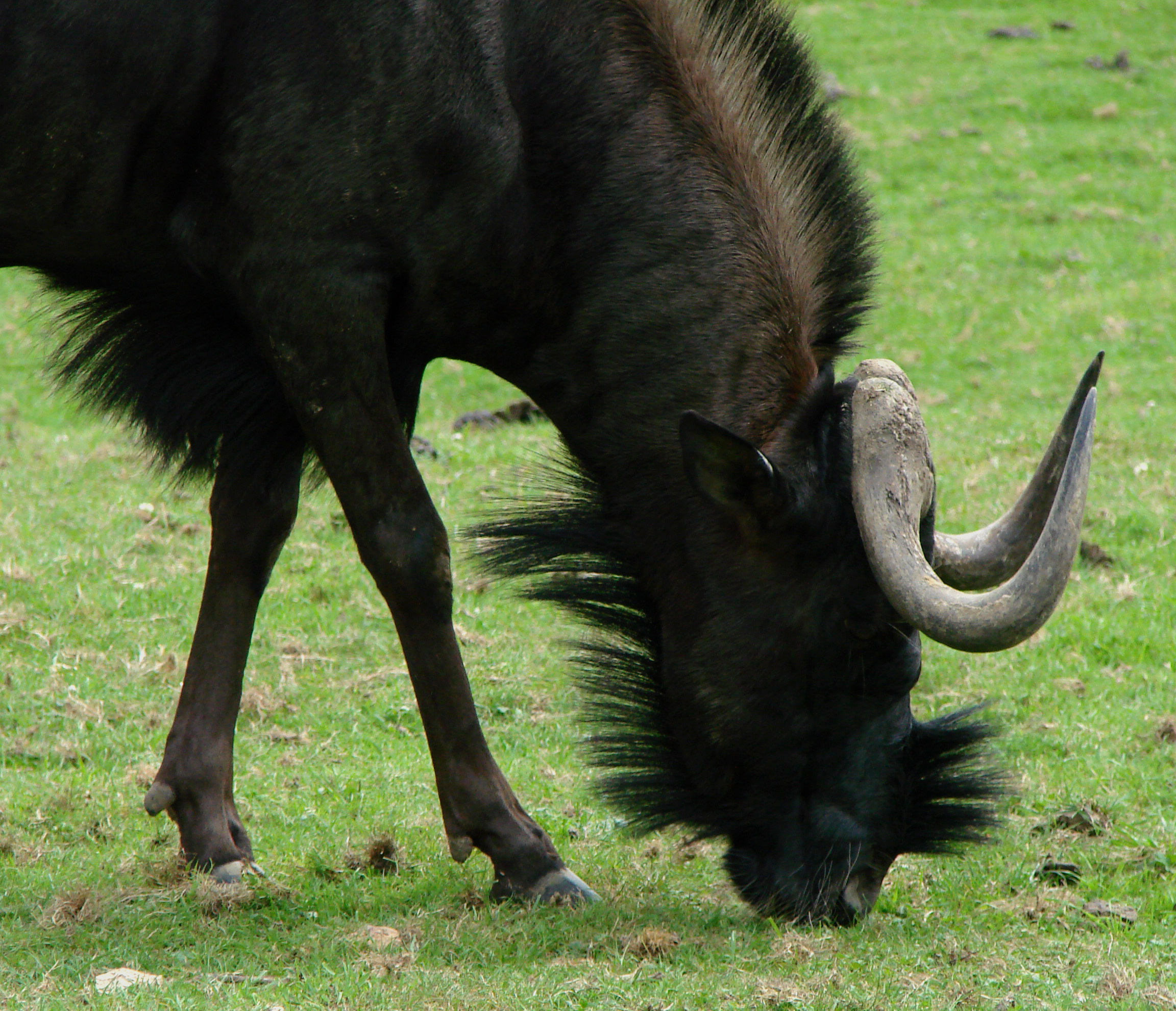
The black wildebeest is primarily a grazer

Black wildebeest are predominantly grazers, preferring short karroid grasses, but also feeding on other karroid herbs, bushes, and shrubs, especially when grass is scarce. Shrubs can comprise as much as 37% of the diet, but grasses normally form more than 90%. Water is essential, though they can exist without drinking water every day. The herds graze either in line or in loose groups, usually walking in single file when moving about. They are often accompanied by cattle egrets, which pick out and consume the insects hidden in their coats or disturbed by their movements.

Before the arrival of Europeans in the area, wildebeest roamed widely, probably in relation to the arrival of the rains and the availability of good forage. They never made such extensive migrations as the blue wildebeest, but at one time, they crossed the Drakensberg Range, moving eastwards in autumn, searching for good pastures. Then they returned to the highvelds in the spring and moved towards the west, where sweet potato and karoo vegetation were abundant. They also moved from north to south as the sourgrass found north of the Vaal River matured and became unpalatable, the wildebeest only consuming young shoots of sourgrass. Now, almost all black wildebeest are in reserves or on farms, and the extent of their movements is limited.

In a study of the feeding activities of a number of female black wildebeest living in a shadeless habitat, they fed mostly at night. They were observed at regular intervals over a period of one year, and with an increase in temperature, the number of wildebeest feeding at night also increased. During cool weather, they lay down to rest, but in hotter conditions they rested while standing up.

=== Reproduction ===
Male black wildebeest reach sexual maturity at the age of 3 years, but may mature at a younger age in captivity. Females first come into estrus and breed as yearlings or as 2-year-olds. They breed only once in a year.

A dominant male black wildebeest has a harem of females and will not allow other males to mate with them. The breeding season occurs at the end of the rainy season and lasts a few weeks between February and April. When one of his females comes into estrus, the male concentrates on her and mates with her several times. Sexual behaviour by the male at this time includes stretching low, ears down, sniffing of the female's vulva, performing ritual urination, and touching his chin to the female's rump. At the same time, the female keeps her tail upwards (sometimes vertically) or swishes it across the face of the male. The pair usually separates after copulation, but the female occasionally follows her mate afterwards, touching his rump with her snout. During the breeding season, the male loses condition, as he spends little time grazing. Males are known to mount other males.

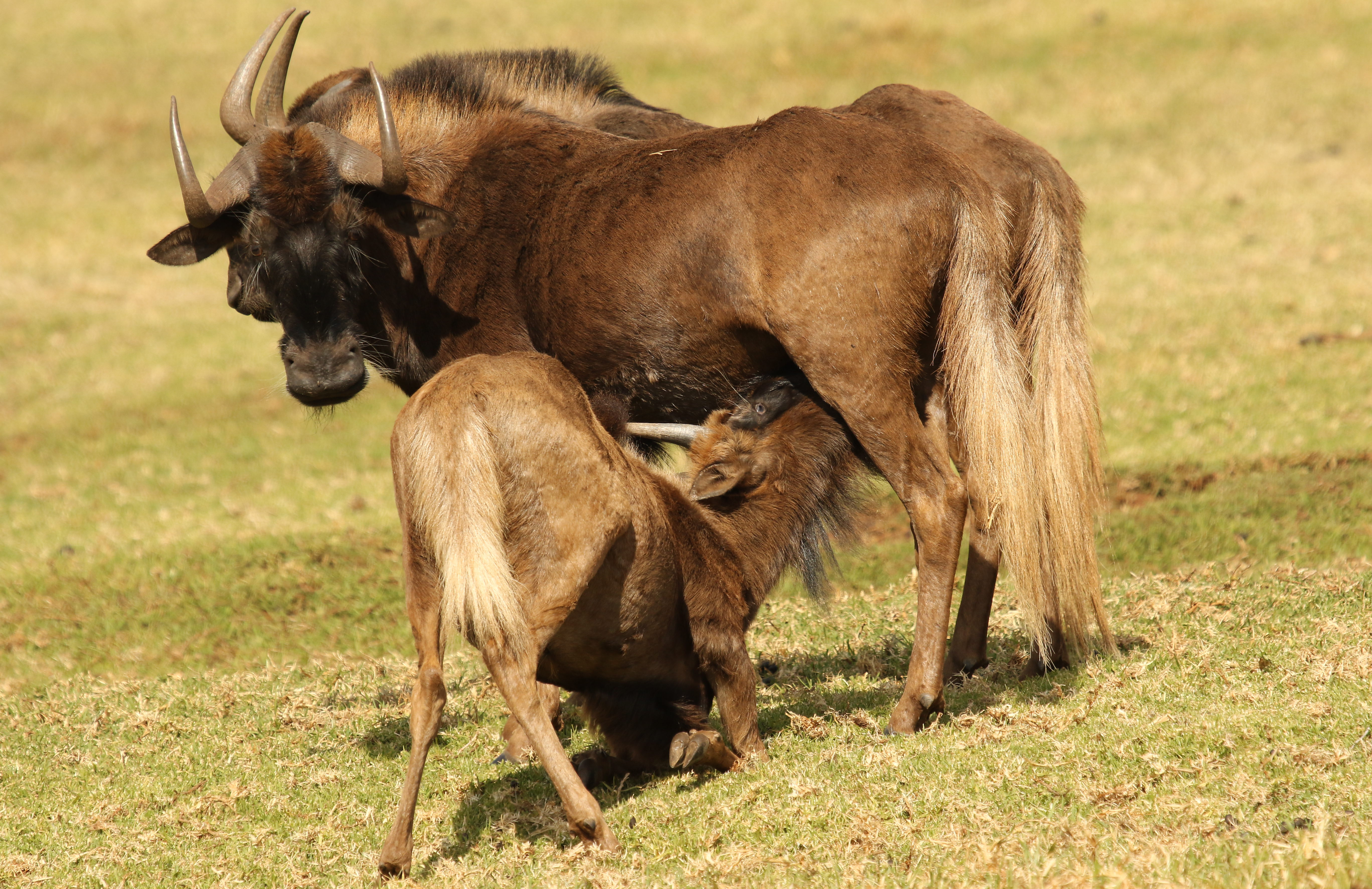
A female with a suckling calf at Krugersdorp Game Park in Gauteng, South Africa

The gestation period lasts for about 8.5 months, after which a single calf is born. Females in labour do not move away from the female herd and repeatedly lie down and get up again. Births normally take place in areas with short grass when the cow is in the lying position. She stands up immediately afterwards, which causes the umbilical cord to break, and vigorously licks the calf and chews on the afterbirth. In spite of regional variations, around 80% of the females give birth to their calves within a period of 2–3 weeks after the onset of the rainy season - from mid-November to the end of December. Seasonal breeding has also been reported among wildebeest in captivity in European zoos. Twin births have not been reported.

The calf has a tawny, shaggy coat and weighs about 11 kg (24 lb). By the end of the fourth week, the four incisors have fully emerged and about the same time, two knob-like structures, the horn buds, appear on the head. These later develop into horns, which reach a length of 20–25 cm (8–10 in) by the fifth month and are well developed by the eighth month. The calf is able to stand and run shortly after birth, a period of great danger for animals in the wild. It is fed by its lactating mother for 6–8 months, begins nibbling on grass blades at one month, and remains with the mother until her next calf is born a year later.

== Distribution and habitat ==
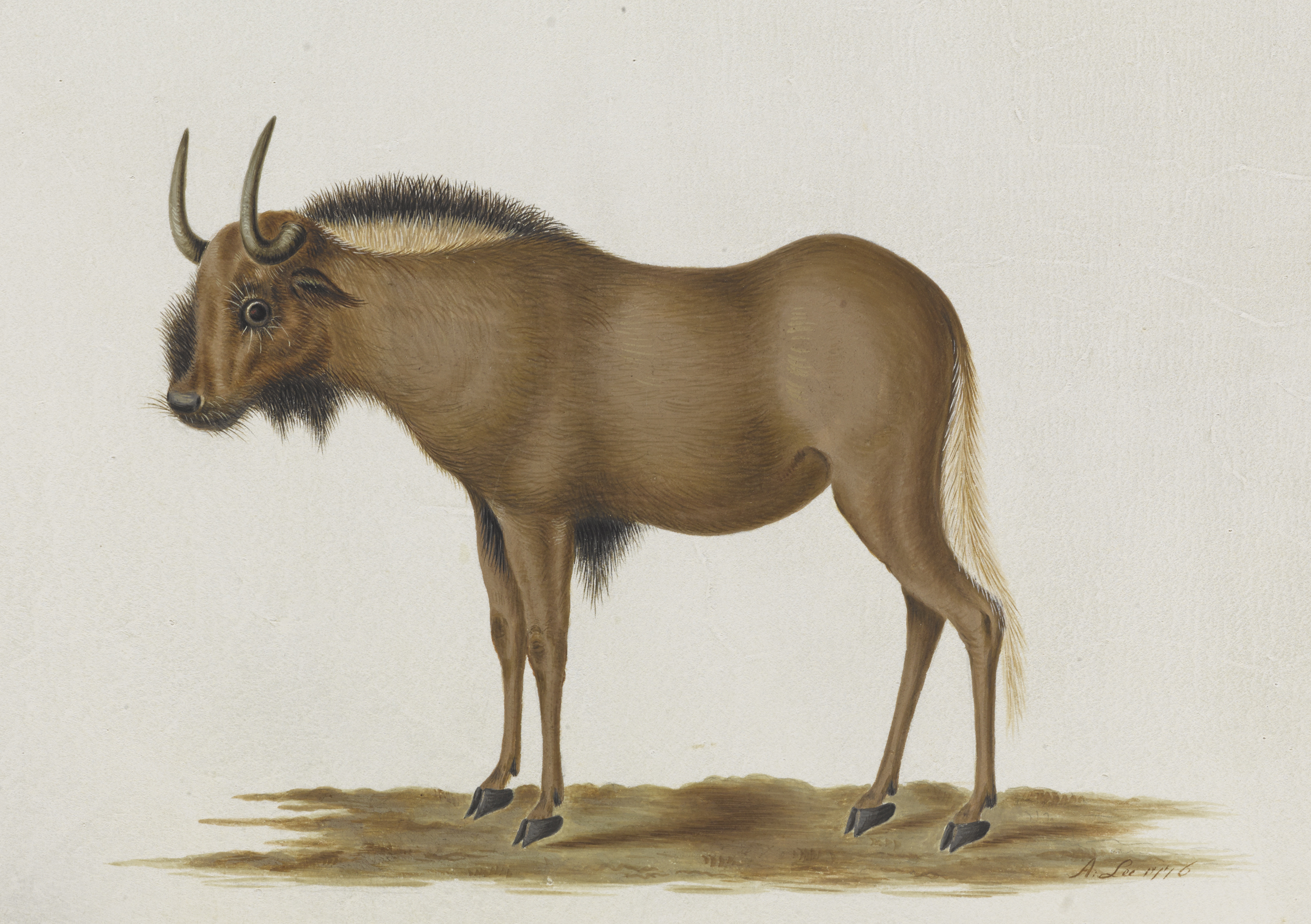
Painting of a black wildebeest by Ann Lee (1753 – 1790)

The black wildebeest is native to southern Africa. Its historical range included South Africa, Eswatini, and Lesotho, but in the latter two countries, it was hunted to extinction in the 19th century. It has now been reintroduced there and also introduced to Namibia, where it has become well established.

The black wildebeest inhabits open plains, grasslands, and karoo shrublands in both steep, mountainous regions and lower, undulating hills. The altitudes in these areas vary from 1,350–2,150 m (4,430–7,050 ft). The herds are often migratory or nomadic, otherwise they may have regular home ranges of 1 km^{2} (0.39 sq mi). Female herds roam in home ranges around 250 acres (100 ha; 0.39 sq mi) in size. In the past, black wildebeest occurred on temperate grasslands in highveld during the dry winter season and the arid karoo region during the rains. However, as a result of massive hunting of the animal for its hide, they vanished from their historical range, and are now largely limited to game farms and protected reserves in southern Africa. In most reserves, the black wildebeest shares its habitat with the blesbok and the springbok.

== Threats and conservation ==
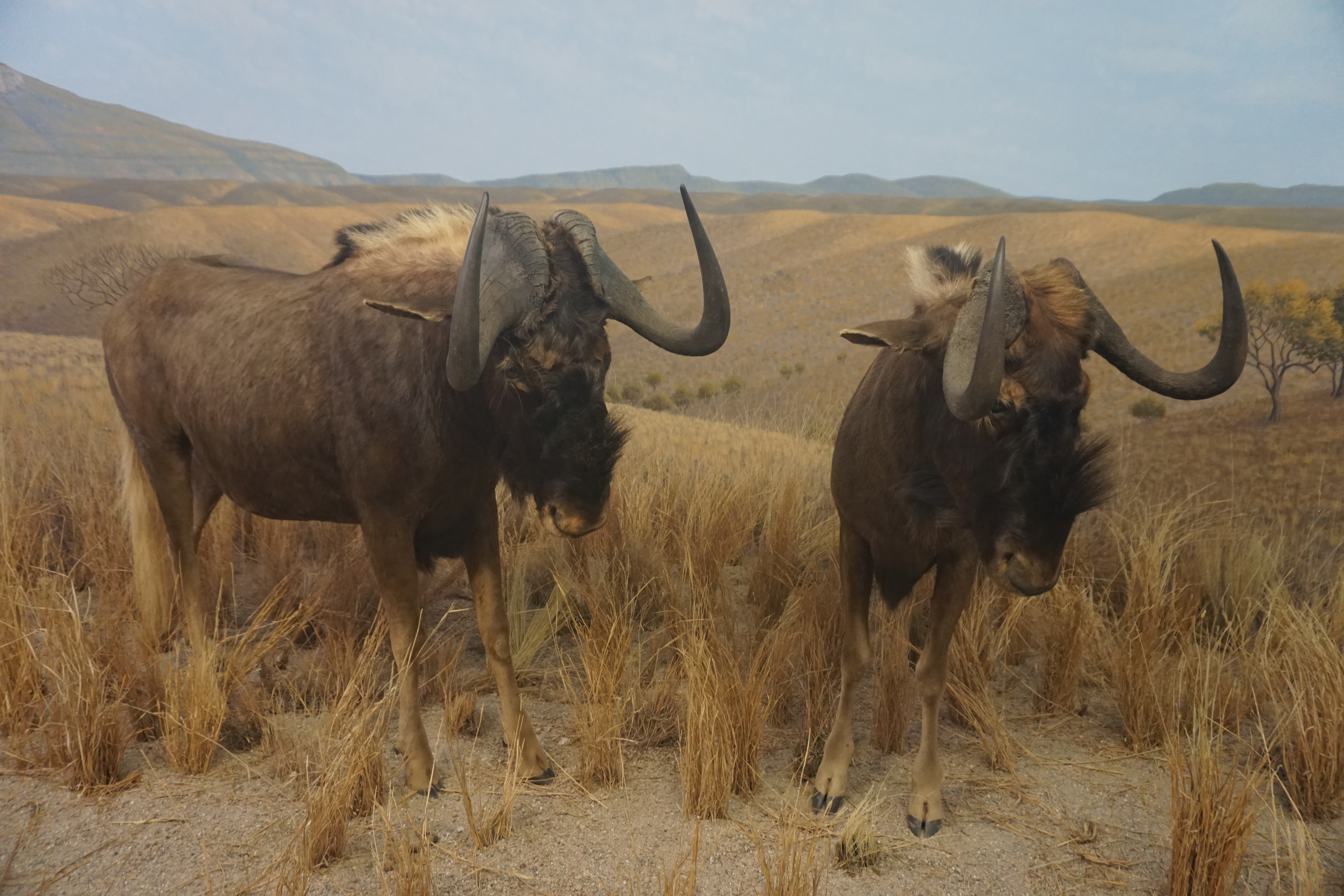
The Southern Grasslands: The White-Tailed Gnu diorama at the Milwaukee Public Museum

Where it lives alongside the blue wildebeest, the two species can hybridise, and this is regarded as a potential threat to the maintenance of the species. The black wildebeest was once very numerous and was present in Southern Africa in vast herds, but by the end of the 19th century, it had nearly been hunted to extinction and fewer than 600 animals remained. A small number of individuals was still present in game reserves and at zoos, and from these, the population was rescued.

More than 18,000 individuals are now believed to remain, 7,000 of which are in Namibia, outside their natural range, and where they are farmed. Around 80% of the wildebeest occurs in private areas, while the other 20% is confined in protected areas. The population is now trending upward (particularly on private land) and for this reason the International Union for Conservation of Nature, in its Red List of Threatened Species, rates the black wildebeest as being of least concern Its introduction into Namibia has been a success and numbers have increased substantially there from 150 in 1982 to 7,000 in 1992.

== Uses and interaction with humans ==
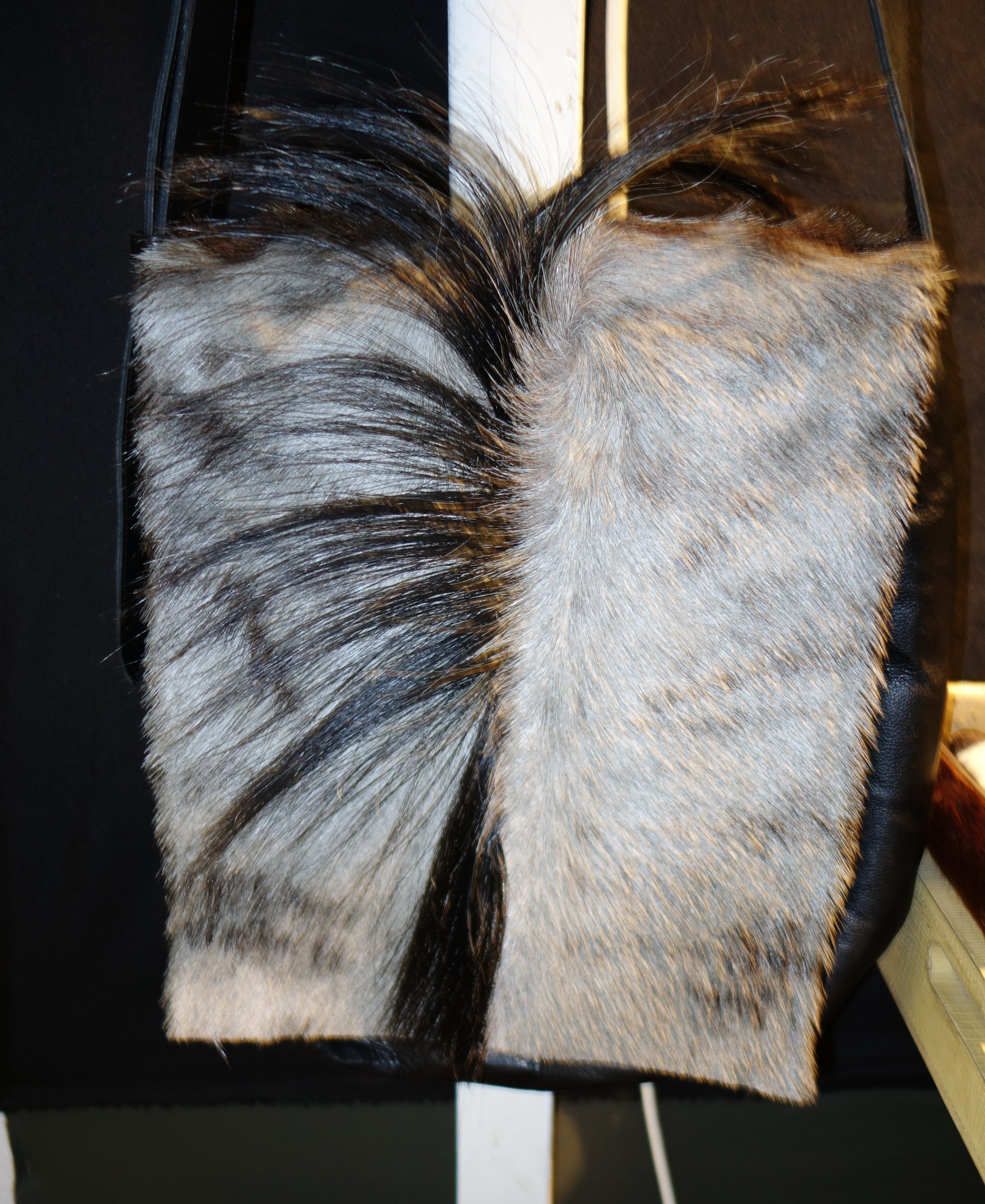
A bag made with wildebeest skin

The black wildebeest is depicted on the coat of arms of the Province of Natal in South Africa. Over the years, the South African authorities have issued stamps displaying the animal and the South African Mint has struck a 5-rand coin with a prancing black wildebeest.

Though they are not present in their natural habitat in such large numbers today, black wildebeest were at one time the main herbivores in the ecosystem and the main prey item for large predators such as the lion. Now, they are economically important for human beings, as they are a major tourist attraction, and provide animal products such as leather and meat. The hide makes good-quality leather, and the flesh is coarse, dry, and rather tough. Wildebeest meat is dried to make biltong, an important part of South African cuisine. The meat of females is more tender than that of males, and is at its best during the autumn season. The wildebeest can provide 10 times as much meat as a Thomson's gazelle. The silky, flowing tail is used to make fly-whisks or chowries.

However, black wildebeest can also affect human beings negatively. Wild individuals can be competitors of commercial livestock and can transmit fatal diseases such as rinderpest, and cause epidemics among animals, particularly domestic cattle. They can also spread ticks, lungworms, tapeworms, flies, and paramphistome flukes.
