= Butyl methacrylate =

Names
- Preferred IUPAC name Butyl 2-methylprop-2-enoate
- Other names Butyl 2-methylpropenoate, Acryester B, Acryester BMA, n-butyl methacrylate

Identifiers
CAS Number	97-88-1
3D model (JSmol)	Interactive image
ChEMBL	ChEMBL3183073
ChemSpider	7076
ECHA InfoCard	100.002.378
EC Number	202-615-1
PubChem CID	7354
RTECS number	OZ3675000
UNII	R5QX287XXU
UN number	2227
CompTox Dashboard (EPA)	DTXSID4024696
- InChI: InChI=1S/C8H14O2/c1-4-5-6-10-8(9)7(2)3/h2,4-6H2,1,3H3 Key: SOGAXMICEFXMKE-UHFFFAOYSA-N
- SMILES: CCCCOC(=O)C(=C)C

Properties
Chemical formula	C_{8}H_{14}O_{2}
Molar mass	142.198 g·mol^{−1}
Appearance	colorless liquid
Density	0.8936 g/cm^{3}
Melting point	−25 °C (−13 °F; 248 K)
Boiling point	160 °C (320 °F; 433 K)

Hazards
- GHS labelling
Pictograms	(GHS02: Flammable) (GHS07: Exclamation mark)
Signal word	Danger
Hazard statements	H226, H315, H317, H319, H335
Precautionary statements	P210, P233, P240, P241, P242, P243, P261, P264, P271, P272, P280, P302+P352, P303+P361+P353, P304+P340, P305+P351+P338, P312, P321, P332+P313, P333+P313, P337+P313, P362, P363, P370+P378, P403+P233, P403+P235, P405, P501
NFPA 704 (fire diamond)	1 2 2
Flash point	50 °C (122 °F; 323 K)
Autoignition temperature	290 °C (554 °F; 563 K)
- Except where otherwise noted, data are given for materials in their standard state (at 25 °C [77 °F], 100 kPa). Infobox references

Butyl methacrylate is the organic compound with the formula C_{4}H_{9}O_{2}CC(CH_{3})=CH_{2}. A colorless liquid, it is a common monomer for the preparation of methacrylate polymers. It is typically polymerized under free-radical conditions.

== Health hazards ==
In terms of the acute toxicity of butyl methacrylate, the LD_{50} is 20 g/kg (oral, rat). It is an irritant to the eyes and can cause blindness.

== See also ==
- Methacrylic acid
- Methyl methacrylate
- tert-Butyl methacrylate
