= Tert-Butyl methacrylate =

tert-Butyl methacrylate

Identifiers
CAS Number	585-07-9
3D model (JSmol)	Interactive image
ChemSpider	10964
ECHA InfoCard	100.008.682
EC Number	209-548-7
PubChem CID	11448
UNII	F9029V5818
UN number	1993
CompTox Dashboard (EPA)	DTXSID3060405
- InChI: InChI=1S/C8H14O2/c1-6(2)7(9)10-8(3,4)5/h1H2,2-5H3 Key: SJMYWORNLPSJQO-UHFFFAOYSA-N
- SMILES: CC(=C)C(=O)OC(C)(C)C

Properties
Chemical formula	C_{8}H_{14}O_{2}
Molar mass	142.198 g·mol^{−1}
Appearance	Colorless solid
Density	0.8746 g/cm³
Melting point	122 °C (252 °F; 395 K)
Boiling point	60–61 °C (140–142 °F; 333–334 K) 50 Torr

Hazards
- GHS labelling
Pictograms	(GHS02: Flammable) (GHS07: Exclamation mark)
Signal word	Warning
Hazard statements	H226, H315, H319, H335
Precautionary statements	P210, P233, P240, P241, P242, P243, P261, P264, P264+P265, P271, P280, P302+P352, P303+P361+P353, P304+P340, P305+P351+P338, P319, P321, P332+P317, P337+P317, P362+P364, P370+P378, P403+P233, P403+P235, P405, P501
- Except where otherwise noted, data are given for materials in their standard state (at 25 °C [77 °F], 100 kPa). Infobox references

tert-Butyl methacrylate is an organic compound with the formula (CH_{3})_{3}CO_{2}CC(CH_{3})=CH_{2}. A colorless solid, it is a common monomer for the preparation of methacrylate polymers. It is employed in other kinds of polymerizations.

== See also ==
- Butyl methacrylate
