= Cyclohexyl acetate =

Names
- IUPAC name Cyclohexyl acetate
- Other names: Acetoxycyclohexane; Acetic acid, cyclohexyl ester; Hexalin acetate; Cyclohexanol acetate; Cyclohexane acetate; Cyclohexanyl acetate

Identifiers
CAS Number	622-45-7
3D model (JSmol)	Interactive image
ChEBI	CHEBI:31447
ChemSpider	11647
ECHA InfoCard	100.009.761
EC Number	210-736-6
KEGG	C12297
PubChem CID	12146
UNII	UL0RS4H1UE
UN number	2243
CompTox Dashboard (EPA)	DTXSID6052299
- InChI: InChI=1S/C8H14O2/c1-7(9)10-8-5-3-2-4-6-8/h8H,2-6H2,1H3 Key: YYLLIJHXUHJATK-UHFFFAOYSA-N
- SMILES: CC(=O)OC1CCCCC1

Properties
Chemical formula	C_{8}H_{14}O_{2}
Molar mass	142.198 g·mol^{−1}
Appearance	Colorless liquid
Odor	Fruity, sweet, banana or apple
Density	0.966 g/cm^{3}
Melting point	−77 °C (−107 °F; 196 K)
Boiling point	173 °C (343 °F; 446 K)
Solubility in water	Insoluble; 1.56 g/l
Solubility	Miscible with diethyl ether.
Solubility in ethanol	580.47 g/l
Solubility in methanol	769.91 g/l
Solubility in isopropanol	596.92 g/l
Vapor pressure	14.6 hPa at 25 °C; 35 hPa at 50 °C; 60 hPa at 65 °C
Refractive index (n_{D})	1.439

Hazards
- Occupational safety and health (OHS/OSH)
Main hazards	Highly flammable, eye and respiratory tract irritation
- GHS labelling
Pictograms	(GHS02: Flammable) (GHS07: Exclamation mark)
Signal word	Warning
Hazard statements	H226, H315
Precautionary statements	P210, P233, P240, P241, P242, P243, P280, P303+P361+P353, P370+P378, P403+P235, P501
Flash point	58 °C (136 °F; 331 K)
Autoignition temperature	330 °C (626 °F; 603 K)
- Lethal dose or concentration (LD, LC)
LD_{50} (median dose)	6.73 g/kg (rat, oral); 10.1 g/kg (rabbit, dermal)

Related compounds
Related compounds	Hexyl acetate; Phenyl acetate
- Except where otherwise noted, data are given for materials in their standard state (at 25 °C [77 °F], 100 kPa). Infobox references

Cyclohexyl acetate is an organic compound with the chemical formula CH_{3}CO_{2}C_{6}H_{11}. It is a colorless liquid with a fruity, sweet, banana or apple odor. It is the cyclohexyl ester of acetic acid.

== Synthesis ==
Cyclohexyl acetate can be synthesized by esterification reaction between acetic acid and cyclohexanol at elevated temperature with trace amounts of sulfuric acid as a catalyst or by reaction of cyclohexene with acetic acid.

== Occurrence ==
Cyclohexyl acetate has been reported in Glycine max (soybean), Malus pumila (paradise apple), Garcinia dulcis, Mangifera indica (mango), Malus domestica (apple), Allium cepa (onion), Allium fistulosum (Welsh onion), Brassica (cabbage family) and even in Homo sapiens (human).

== Uses ==
Cyclohexyl acetate is used as a solvent and in making rubber. It is a powerful solvent for nitrocellulose and other cellulose esters, many resins, gums. It is also used leather industry for improving adhesion of leather varnishes. In the food industry, it is used as a flavoring agent. Can be used as a paint solvent. Cyclohexyl acetate is used as a fragrance in cosmetics and cleaning agents.

== Safety ==
Vapors of cyclohexyl acetate are much heavier than air and may be narcotic in high concentrations. Vapors are heavier than air and may travel to the source of ignition and flash back. Vapor may form explosive mixtures with air. The lower explosive limit (LEL) is 0.9 vol% (54 g/m^{3}). It is skin, eye and respiratory tract irritant. May cause drowsiness, lowered consciousness and unconsciousness upon vapor inhalation or ingestion of large quantities, but it is safe when used as a flavoring agent. Cyclohexyl acetate emits acrid smoke and irritating fumes when heated to high temperatures. Containers of cyclohexyl acetate may explode when heated. Do not spill into drains because of risk of explosion.
