= Γ-Octalactone =

γ-Octalactone

Names
- Preferred IUPAC name 5-Butyloxolan-2-one
- Other names 2(3H)-Furanone, 5-butyldihydro-; 4-Octanolide; 5-Butyldihydro-2(3H)-furanone; (R/S)-γ-octalactone; 5-Butyldihydrofuran-2(3H)-one; 4-Hydroxyoctanoic acid lactone; γ-Octanolactone; γ-Octalactone; Octan-4-olide; Octanoic acid 4-hydroxy-γ-lactone; γ-Octanolide; γ-Butyl-γ-butyrolactone; γ-Butylbutyrolactone; 4-Butyl-γ-butyrolactone; 5-Butyltetrahydro-2-furanone; γ-n-Butyl-γ-butyrolactone; Octanoic acid, γ lactone; Octanolide-1,4; 2(3H)-Furanone, dihydro-5-butyl-; 4-Hydroxyoctanoic acid, γ-lactone; NSC 24270; Octanoic acid, 4-hydroxy-, lactone

Identifiers
CAS Number	104-50-7
3D model (JSmol)	Interactive image
ChEBI	CHEBI:145738
ChEMBL	ChEMBL3559967
ChemSpider	7418
ECHA InfoCard	100.002.917
EC Number	203-208-1
PubChem CID	7704
UNII	UHD6M52X0K
CompTox Dashboard (EPA)	DTXSID1047609
- InChI: InChI=1S/C8H14O2/c1-2-3-4-7-5-6-8(9)10-7/h7H,2-6H2,1H3 Key: IPBFYZQJXZJBFQ-UHFFFAOYSA-N
- SMILES: CCCCC1CCC(=O)O1

Properties
Chemical formula	C_{8}H_{14}O_{2}
Molar mass	142.198 g·mol^{−1}
Appearance	colorless solid
Density	0.9703 g/cm³
Melting point	91 °C (196 °F; 364 K)
Boiling point	234 °C (453 °F; 507 K)
- Except where otherwise noted, data are given for materials in their standard state (at 25 °C [77 °F], 100 kPa). Infobox references

γ-Octalactone is an organic compound with the chemical formula C_{8}H_{14}O_{2}. It is classified as lactone and used as an fragrance It has a coconut flavor.

== Preparation and occurrence ==
γ-Octalactone is prepared from crotonic acid and pentanal.

It is a component of urban aerosols as well as some liquors.
