= Δ-Octalactone =

δ-Octalactone

Names
- Preferred IUPAC name 6-Propyloxan-2-one
- Other names Tetrahydro-6-propyl-2H-pyran-2-one

Identifiers
CAS Number	698-76-0
3D model (JSmol)	Interactive image
ChemSpider	12252
ECHA InfoCard	100.010.747
EC Number	211-820-5
PubChem CID	12777
UNII	8AA944C37V
CompTox Dashboard (EPA)	DTXSID5047164
- InChI: InChI=1S/C8H14O2/c1-2-4-7-5-3-6-8(9)10-7/h7H,2-6H2,1H3 Key: FYTRVXSHONWYNE-UHFFFAOYSA-N; InChI=1S/C8H14O2/c1-2-4-7-5-3-6-8(9)10-7/h7H,2-6H2,1H3 Key: FYTRVXSHONWYNE-UHFFFAOYSA-N
- SMILES: CCCC1CCCC(=O)O1

Properties
Chemical formula	C_{8}H_{14}O_{2}
Molar mass	142.198 g·mol^{−1}
Appearance	Colorless to pale yellow liquid
Density	1.002 g/cm^{3}
Boiling point	238 °C (460 °F; 511 K)
- Except where otherwise noted, data are given for materials in their standard state (at 25 °C [77 °F], 100 kPa). (what is ?) Infobox references

δ-Octalactone is a lactone and aroma compound with a creamy cocoa, coconut, and peach flavor. Its chemical formula is C_{8}H_{14}O_{2}.
