= Cyclohexanecarboxylic acid =

Names
- Preferred IUPAC name Cyclohexanecarboxylic acid

Identifiers
CAS Number	98–89–5
3D model (JSmol)	Interactive image
ChEBI	CHEBI:36096
ChemSpider	7135
ECHA InfoCard	100.002.465
PubChem CID	7413
UNII	H9VKD9VL18
CompTox Dashboard (EPA)	DTXSID8059180
- InChI: InChI=1S/C7H12O2/c8-7(9)6-4-2-1-3-5-6/h6H,1-5H2,(H,8,9) Key: NZNMSOFKMUBTKW-UHFFFAOYSA-N; InChI=1/C7H12O2/c8-7(9)6-4-2-1-3-5-6/h6H,1-5H2,(H,8,9) Key: NZNMSOFKMUBTKW-UHFFFAOYAH
- SMILES: O=C(O)C1CCCCC1

Properties
Chemical formula	C_{7}H_{12}O_{2}
Molar mass	128.171 g·mol^{−1}
Appearance	white solid
Density	1.0274 g/cm^{3}
Melting point	30–31 °C (86–88 °F; 303–304 K)
Boiling point	232–234 °C (450–453 °F; 505–507 K)
Magnetic susceptibility (χ)	−83.24·10^{−6} cm^{3}/mol
- Except where otherwise noted, data are given for materials in their standard state (at 25 °C [77 °F], 100 kPa). Infobox references

Cyclohexanecarboxylic acid is the organic compound with the formula C_{6}H_{11}CO_{2}H or C_{6}H_{11}COOH. It is the carboxylic acid of cyclohexane. It is a colorless oil that crystallizes near room temperature.

== Preparation and reactions ==
It is prepared by hydrogenation of benzoic acid.

Cyclohexanecarboxylic acid is a precursor to the nylon-6 precursor caprolactam via its reaction with nitrosylsulfuric acid. It can also be oxidized to cyclohexene.

Cyclohexanecarboxylic acid exhibits the reactions typical of carboxylic acids, including its conversion to the acid chloride cyclohexanecarbonyl chloride using thionyl chloride or oxalyl chloride and to various other acyl derivatives either directly or by way of the acyl halide.

Esterification to ethyl cyclohexanoate [3289-28-9] (aka Esterly™) described as "Ripe fruit, apple, strawberry." (synthesis:).

== Biochemistry ==
Cyclohexanecarboxylic acid is a product in the metabolism of benzoic acid in certain microorganisms. In rat models, cyclohexanecarboxylic acid was found to have anti-convulsant activity in a manner similar to valproic acid.

== Related compounds ==
- 1,4-Cyclohexanedicarboxylic acid
- Quinic acid, a polyhydroxy derivative
- Methyl cyclohexanecarboxylate, the methyl ester
