= Methyl cyclohexanecarboxylate =

Names
- Other names: Methyl cyclohexanoate; Methyl hexahydrobenzoate

Identifiers
CAS Number	4630-82-4
3D model (JSmol)	Interactive image
ChEBI	CHEBI:88845
ChemSpider	19536
ECHA InfoCard	100.022.773
EC Number	225-050-2
PubChem CID	20748
UNII	96144H696Q
CompTox Dashboard (EPA)	DTXSID9074303
- InChI: InChI=1S/C8H14O2/c1-10-8(9)7-5-3-2-4-6-7/h7H,2-6H2,1H3 Key: ZQWPRMPSCMSAJU-UHFFFAOYSA-N
- SMILES: O=C(OC)C1CCCCC1

Properties
Chemical formula	C_{8}H_{14}O_{2}
Molar mass	142.198 g·mol^{−1}
Density	0.9787 g/cm^{3}
Melting point	48–50 °C (118–122 °F; 321–323 K)
Boiling point	68 °C (154 °F; 341 K) at 13.5 Torr

Hazards
- GHS labelling
Pictograms	(GHS02: Flammable)
Signal word	Warning
Hazard statements	H226
Precautionary statements	P210, P233, P240, P241, P242, P243, P280, P303+P361+P353, P370+P378, P403+P235, P501
- Except where otherwise noted, data are given for materials in their standard state (at 25 °C [77 °F], 100 kPa). Infobox references

Methyl cyclohexanecarboxylate is an ester derived from methyl alcohol and cyclohexanecarboxylic acid. It is a food additive used as a flavoring agent in various types of desserts. The chemical has also been found as a component of the interdigital glands of blue wildebeest.
