= Testosterone hexahydrobenzoate =

Chemical compound

Clinical data
- Trade names: Testormon Depot, Sterandryl Retard, Tardosterandryl, Testodur, Virex
- Other names: THHB; Testosterone cyclohexanecarboxylate; TCHC; Testosterone 17β-cyclohexanecarboxylate
- Routes of administration: Intramuscular injection

Identifiers
- IUPAC name: (1S,2R,10R,11S,14S,15S)-2,15-dimethyl-5-oxotetracyclo[rfgcgg^{2,7}.0^{11,15}]heptadec-6-en-14-yl cyclohexanecarboxylate
- CAS Number: 14191-92-5
- PubChem CID: 21116124
- ChemSpider: 19972137
- UNII: T4QOX8847Z
- ECHA InfoCard: 100.034.571

Chemical and physical data
- Formula: C_{26}H_{38}O_{3}
- Molar mass: 398.587 g·mol^{−1}
- 3D model (JSmol): Interactive image
- SMILES: C[C@]12CC[C@H]3[C@H]([C@@H]1CC[C@@H]2OC(=O)C4CCCCC4)CCC5=CC(=O)CC[C@]35C
- InChI: InChI=1S/C26H38O3/c1-25-14-12-19(27)16-18(25)8-9-20-21-10-11-23(26(21,2)15-13-22(20)25)29-24(28)17-6-4-3-5-7-17/h16-17,20-23H,3-15H2,1-2H3/t20-,21-,22-,23-,25-,26-/m0/s1; Key:YKNXICSCSYLTHK-IXKNJLPQSA-N

Testosterone hexahydrobenzoate (THHB), or testosterone cyclohexanecarboxylate (TCHC), sold under the brand names Testormon Depot, Sterandryl Retard, Tardosterandryl, and Testosteron-Depot among others, is an androgen and anabolic steroid medication and a testosterone ester. It is used by intramuscular injection and is provided in the form of ampoules containing 100 mg THHB in oil solution. THHB has comparable pharmacokinetics to those of testosterone cypionate and testosterone enanthate. The medication is no longer marketed. It was previously available in Great Britain.

== See also ==
- Nandrolone cyclohexanecarboxylate
