= Maleylacetoacetate isomerase =

Class of enzymes

Maleylacetoacetate Isomerase
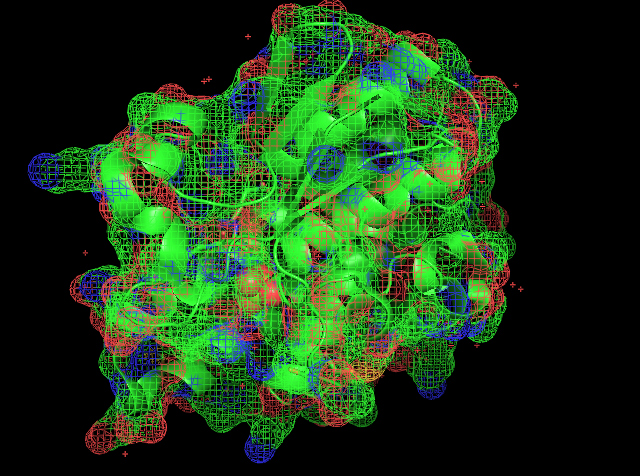
- This represents the surface structure of the enzyme.

Identifiers
- EC no.: 5.2.1.2

Databases
- IntEnz: IntEnz view
- BRENDA: BRENDA entry
- ExPASy: NiceZyme view
- KEGG: KEGG entry
- MetaCyc: metabolic pathway
- PRIAM: profile
- PDB structures: RCSB PDB PDBe PDBsum
- Gene Ontology: AmiGO / QuickGO
Search
- PMC: articles
- PubMed: articles
- NCBI: proteins

Maleylacetoacetate isomerase (EC 5.2.1.2) is an enzyme that catalyzes the chemical reaction

4-Maleylacetoacetic acid
Fumarylacetoacetic acid

This enzyme belongs to the family of isomerases, specifically cis-trans isomerases. The systematic name of this enzyme class is 4-maleylacetoacetate cis-trans-isomerase.

4-Maleylacetoacetate isomerase is an enzyme involved in the degradation of L-phenylalanine. It is encoded by the gene glutathione S-transferase zeta 1, or GSTZ1. This enzyme catalyzes the conversion of 4-maleylacetoacetate to 4-fumarylacetoacetate. 4-Maleylacetoacetate isomerase belongs to the zeta class of the glutathione S-transferase (GST) superfamily.

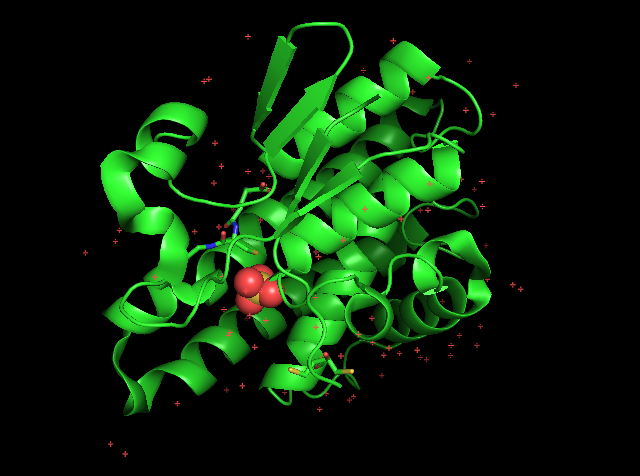
This image shows the structure of the peptide backbone of 4-maleylacetoacetate isomerase, highlighting the glutathione binding site.

== Mechanism ==
In the phenylalanine degradation pathway, 4-maleylacetoacetate isomerase catalyzes a cis-trans isomerization of 4-maleylacetoacetate to fumarylacetoacetate. 4-maleylacetoacetate isomerase requires the cofactor glutathione to function. Ser 15, Cys 16, Gln 111, and the helix dipole of alpha 1 of the enzyme stabilize the thiolate form of glutathione which activates it to attack the alpha carbon of 4-maleylacetoacetate, thus breaking the double bond and allowing rotation around the single bond.

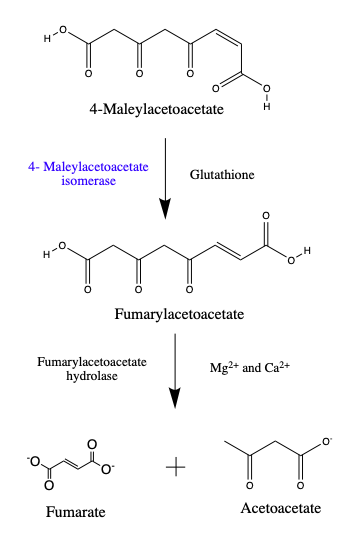
This image shows the conversion of 4-maleylacetoacetate to fumarate and acetoacetate, as well as the enzymes that catalyze each step and cofactors required.

4-maleylacetoacetate is converted to 4-fumarylacetoacetate, this compound can be broken down into fumarate and acetoacetate by the enzyme fumarylacetoacetate hydrolase.

The conversion of 4-maleylacetoacetate to fumarylacetoacetate is a step in the catabolism of phenylalanine and tyrosine, amino acids acquired through dietary protein consumption. When 4-maleylacetoacetate isomerase is unable to function properly, the 4-maleylacetoacetate may be converted instead to succinylacetoacetate and further broken down into succinate and acetoacetate by fumarylacetoacetate hydrolase.

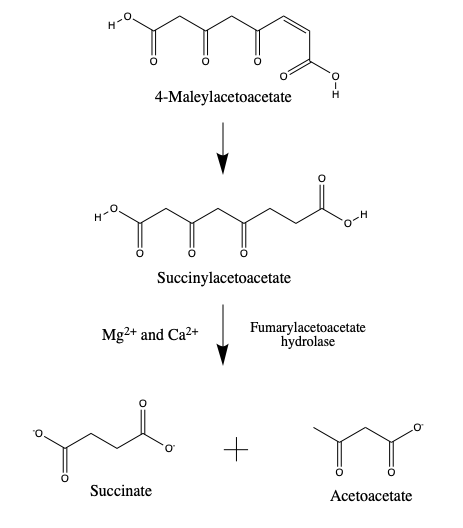
This image shows the pathway that 4-maleylacetoacetate follows when 4-maleylacetoacetate isomerase is not present.

== Structure ==
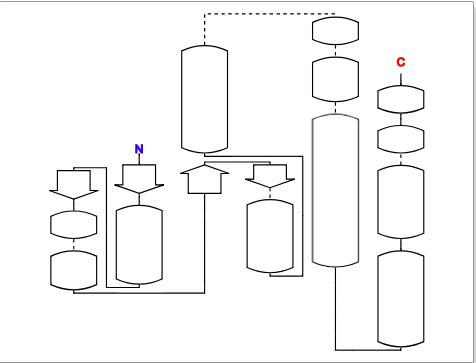
This image shows the folding patterns, as well as both the N- and C-terminals of the enzyme 4-maleylacetoacetate isomerase.

4-maleylacetoacetate is a homodimer. It is classified as an isomerase transferase. It has a total residue count of 216 and a total atom count of 1700. This enzyme's theoretical weight is 24.11 KDa. 4-maleylacetoacetate isomerase has 3 isoforms The most common isoform has two domains, the N-terminal domain (4-87) the C terminal domain (92-212) and the glutathione binding site (14-19, 71-72 and 115-117). The N-terminal domain has a four stranded beta sheet which is sandwiched by alpha helices on both sides to form a three layer sandwich tertiary structure. The C terminal domain is composed mostly of alpha helices and has an up down structure of tightly bundled alpha helices.

Glutathione binds in positions 14-19, 71-72, and 115-117. It also binds the sulfate ion and dithiothreitol.

== Clinical significance ==
Maleylacetoacetate isomerase deficiency is a disease caused by a mutation in the gene GSTZ1.

This is an autosomal recessive inborn error of metabolism. It is caused by a mutation in the gene that codes for the synthesis of 4-maleylacetoacetate isomerase, GSTZ1.

Mutations in 4-maleylacetoacetate isomerase resulted in accumulation of fumarylacetoacetate and succinylacetone in the urine, but individuals were otherwise healthy. It is likely that there exists an alternate nonenzymatic bypass that allows the catabolism of 4-maleylacetoacetate in the absence of 4-maleylacetoacetate isomerase. Because of this mechanism, a mutation in the gene encoding 4-Maleylacetoacetate isomerase is not considered dangerous.

GSTZ1 is highly expressed in the liver, however mutations in this gene do not impair liver function or coagulation.

== Gene expression ==
The gene from which this enzyme is synthesized is mostly expressed in the liver, with some expression in the kidneys, skeletal muscle, and brain. It is also expressed in melanocytes, synovium, placenta, breasts, fetal liver and heart.

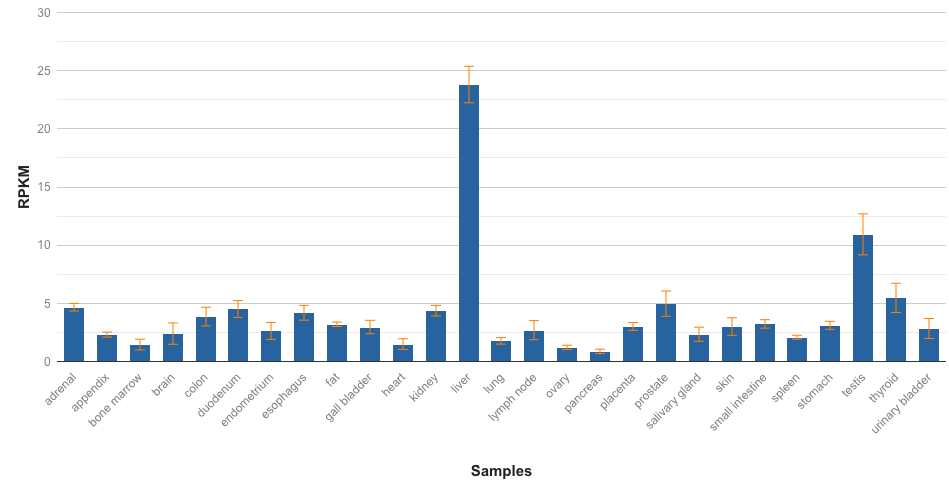
This graph shows where the gene that encodes 4-maleylacetoactetate isomerase is most highly expressed.

== Related enzymes ==
Other enzymes involved in the catabolism of phenylalanine include phenylalanine hydroxylase, aminotransferase, p-hydroxyphenylpyruvate dioxygenase, homogentisate oxidase, and fumarylacetoacetate hydrolase. Mutations in some of these enzymes can lead to more severe diseases such as, phenylketonuria, alkaptonuria, and tyrosinemia.

The gene GSTZ1 is located on chromosome 14q24.3.
