= GSTZ1 =

Protein-coding gene in the species Homo sapiens

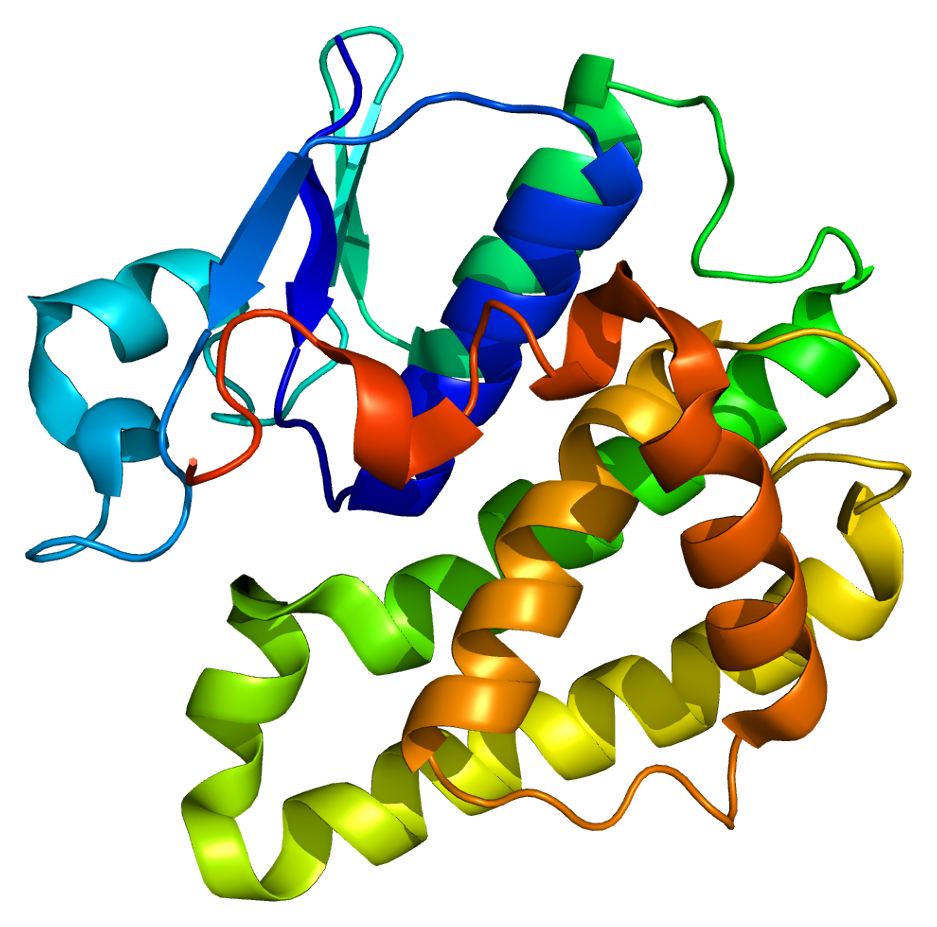
Available structures
PDB	Ortholog search: PDBe RCSB
PDB	List of PDB id codes 1FW1

Identifiers
- Aliases: GSTZ1, GSTZ1-1, MAAI, MAI, glutathione S-transferase zeta 1, MAAID
- External IDs: OMIM: 603758; MGI: 1341859; HomoloGene: 7747; GeneCards: GSTZ1; OMA:GSTZ1 - orthologs

Gene location (Human)
Chr.	Chromosome 14 (human)
Band	14q24.3	Start	77,320,996 bp
Band	14q24.3	End	77,331,597 bp

Gene location (Mouse)
Chr.	Chromosome 12 (mouse)
Band	12|12 D2	Start	87,193,939 bp
Band	12|12 D2	End	87,211,497 bp
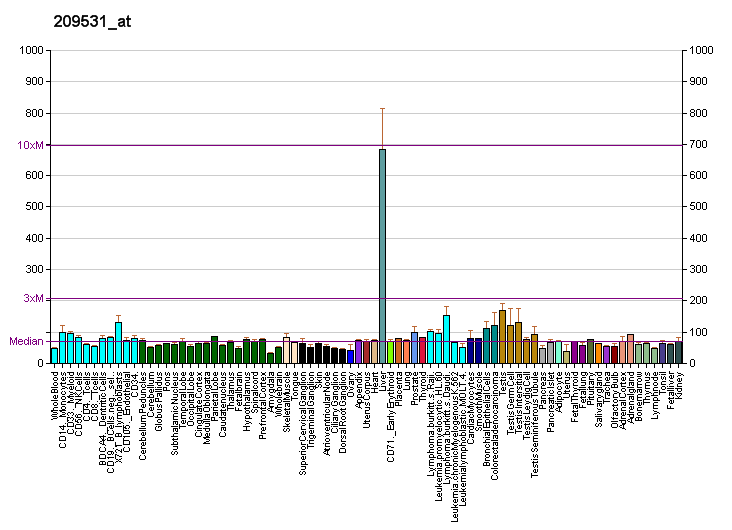
RNA expression pattern
Bgee	Human / Mouse (ortholog); Top expressed in: right lobe of liver; gonad; right testis; left testis; right adrenal gland; muscle of thigh; mucosa of transverse colon; right adrenal cortex; gastrocnemius muscle; left adrenal gland / Top expressed in: lactiferous gland; white adipose tissue; left lobe of liver; right kidney; brown adipose tissue; proximal tubule; subcutaneous adipose tissue; human kidney; intercostal muscle; tunica adventitia of aorta; More reference expression data
BioGPS	More reference expression data
Gene ontology
Molecular function	transferase activity; glutathione peroxidase activity; glutathione transferase activity; maleylacetoacetate isomerase activity; isomerase activity; catalytic activity; protein homodimerization activity; protein binding; identical protein binding; hydrolase activity, acting on acid halide bonds, in C-halide compounds
Cellular component	cytoplasm; cytosol; mitochondrion; mitochondrial matrix
Biological process	aromatic amino acid family metabolic process; metabolism; L-phenylalanine catabolic process; glutathione metabolic process; glutathione derivative biosynthetic process; tyrosine catabolic process; cellular oxidant detoxification; regulation of acetyl-CoA biosynthetic process from pyruvate
Sources:Amigo / QuickGO
Orthologs
Species	Human	Mouse
Entrez	2954	14874
Ensembl	ENSG00000100577	ENSMUSG00000021033
UniProt	O43708	Q9WVL0
RefSeq (mRNA)	NM_001312660; NM_001513; NM_145870; NM_145871; NM_001363703	NM_001252555; NM_001252556; NM_010363; NM_001364306; NM_001364307
RefSeq (protein)	NP_001299589; NP_665877; NP_665878; NP_001350632	NP_001239484; NP_001239485; NP_034493; NP_001351235; NP_001351236
Location (UCSC)	Chr 14: 77.32 – 77.33 Mb	Chr 12: 87.19 – 87.21 Mb
PubMed search
- Wikidata
View/Edit Human	View/Edit Mouse

Glutathione S-transferase Zeta 1 (also known as maleylacetoacetate isomerase) is an enzyme that in humans is encoded by the GSTZ1 gene on chromosome 14.

This gene is a member of the glutathione S-transferase (GSTs) super-family, which encodes multifunctional enzymes important in the detoxification of electrophilic molecules, including carcinogens, mutagens, and several therapeutic drugs, by conjugation with glutathione. This enzyme also plays a significant role in the catabolism of phenylalanine and tyrosine. Thus, defects in this enzyme may lead to severe metabolic disorders, including alkaptonuria, phenylketonuria and tyrosinaemia, and new discoveries may allow the enzyme to protect against certain diseases related to oxidative stress.

== Structure ==
Glutathione S-transferase Zeta 1 (GSTZ1) has a predominantly hydrophobic dimer, just like many other GST members. It is composed of 24.2 kDa subunits and it consists of an N-terminal thioredoxin-like domain and a C-terminal all alpha-helical domain. Both of these domains are intertwined by a linker region between amino acids 85 and 91. The active site of this enzyme is much smaller and more polar than that of other family members of GST, which allows for GSTZ1 to be more selective in terms of substrates. Also, the C-terminus is truncated and the GSTZ1 enzyme lacks the normal V-shaped dimer interface which are usually common in other GSTs. As for the GSTZ1 gene, it is located on chromosome 14q24.3, has 12 exons, and is approximately 10 kb long. GSTZ1 also contains a distinct motif (Ser14–Ser15–Cys16) which is seen as the active center in catalysis.

== Function ==
GSTZ1 is predominantly found in liver cells; more specifically, it is localized in both the cytosol and the mitochondria. GSTZ1 is essentially known for catalyzing glutathione-dependent isomerization of maleylacetoacetate to fumarylacetoacetate, which is the second-to-last step in the vital phenylalanine and tyrosine degradation pathway. It is the only enzyme in the GST family that catalyses a significant process in intermediary metabolism and it ensures that this enzyme can be found in a variety of species from humans to bacteria. Another function of the GSTZ1 is that it is in control of the biotransformation of alpha-haloacids, like dichloroacetic acid (DCA), to glyoxylic acid. This prevents the buildup of DCA, which can lead to asymptomatic hepatotoxicity and a reversible peripheral neuropathy. Both functions for this enzyme requires the presence of glutathione (GSH) in order to work.

== Clinical Significance ==
Deficiencies in any of the enzymes in the catabolism of phenylalanine and tyrosine, like GSTZ1, has led to diseases such as alkaptonuria, phenylketonuria, and several forms of tyrosinemia. A lack of GSTZ1, specifically, leads to the amalgamation of maleylacetoacetate and succinylacetone which has been observed to cause oxidative stress. Also, scarcities have been seen to alter the metabolism of certain drugs and xenobiotics in mice.

Most importantly, researchers have successfully genetically engineered GSTZ1 to mimic one of the most significant antioxidant enzymes, glutathione peroxidase (GPX). GPX is most known for its role to protect cells and tissues against oxidative damage by catalyzing the reduction of hydroperoxides using GSH as a reducing substrate and blocking the radical reaction caused by lipid peroxides. By protecting against this oxidative damage, GPX essentially prevents against degenerative diseases such as atherosclerosis, myocardial ischemia, heart failure, diabetes, pulmonary fibrosis, neurodegenerative disorders, and Alzheimer's disease. However, because of GPX's poor stability and paucity, it cannot be used in clinical studies and other methods must be considered. The newfound seleno-hGSTZ1–1 (or the engineered GSTZ1 enzyme) has a high GPX activity and a very similar reaction mechanism to that of GPX.

== Interactions ==
GSTZ1 has been seen to interact with:

- α-haloacids
- GSH
- Maleylacetoacetate
