= C8H8O6 =

The molecular formula C_{8}H_{8}O_{6} (molar mass: 200.15 g/mol, exact mass: 200.0321 u) may refer to:

- Fumarylacetoacetic acid
- 4-Maleylacetoacetic acid
