= Tyrosinemia =

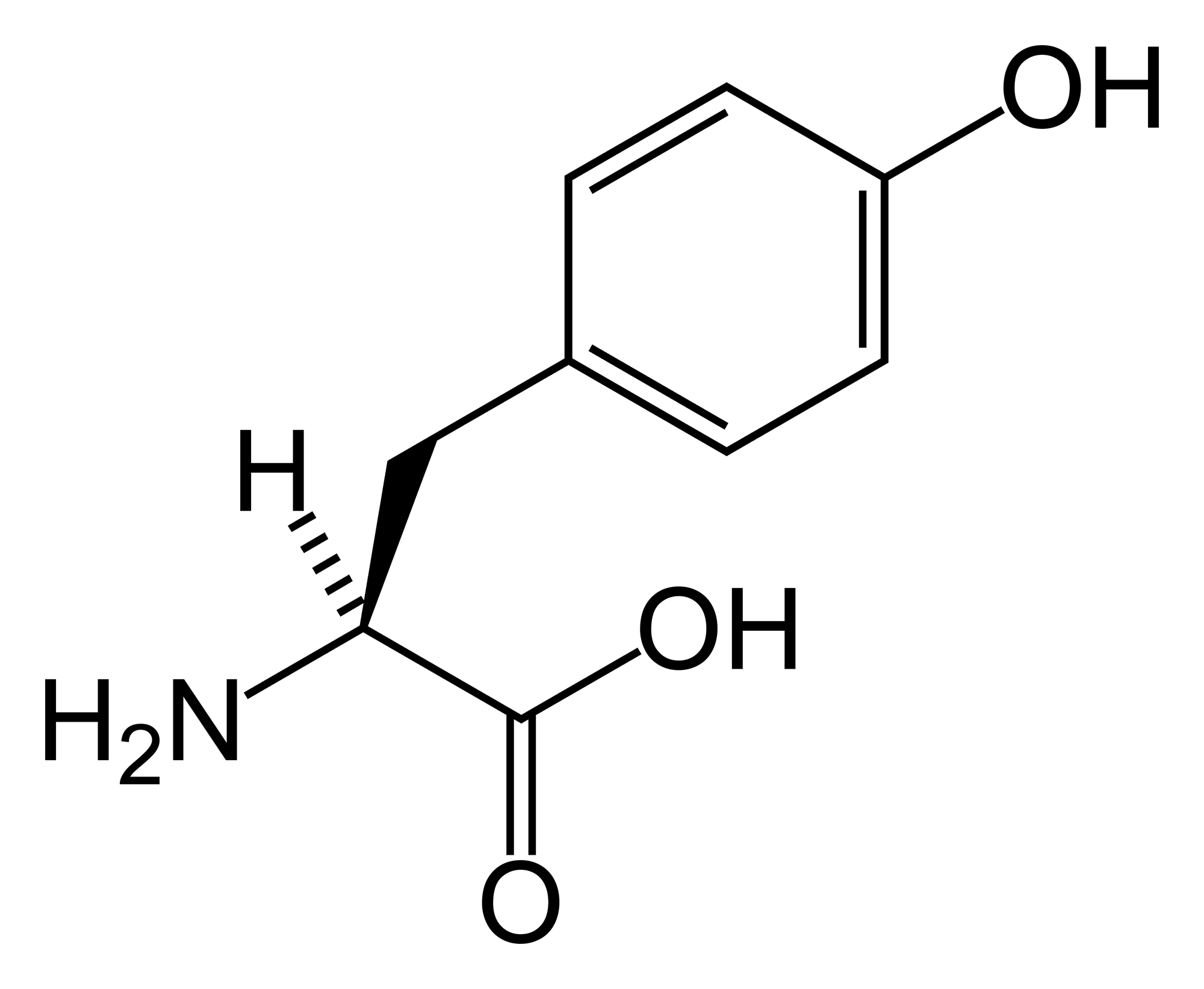
- Tyrosine
- Specialty: Medical genetics

Tyrosinemia or tyrosinaemia is an error of metabolism, usually inborn, in which the body cannot effectively break down the amino acid tyrosine. Symptoms of untreated tyrosinemia include liver and kidney disturbances. Without treatment, tyrosinemia leads to liver failure. Today, tyrosinemia is increasingly detected on newborn screening tests before any symptoms appear. With early and lifelong management involving a low-protein diet, special protein formula, and sometimes medication, people with tyrosinemia develop normally, are healthy, and live normal lives.

== Cause ==
Tyrosinemia is inherited in an autosomal recessive pattern.

All tyrosinemias result from dysfunction of various genes in the phenylalanine and tyrosine catabolic pathway, and are inherited in an autosomal-recessive pattern.

Type I tyrosinemia results from a mutation in the FAH gene, which encodes the enzyme fumarylacetoacetase. As a result of FAH deficiency, the substrate fumarylacetoacetate can accumulate in proximal renal tubular cells and hepatocytes, resulting in damage to the kidney and liver, respectively.

Type II tyrosinemia results from a mutation in the TAT gene, which encodes the enzyme tyrosine aminotransferase. As a result of TAT deficiency, the substrate tyrosine accumulates, causing ophthalmologic and dermatologic abnormalities.

Type III tyrosinemia results from a mutation in the HPD gene, which encodes the enzyme 4-hydroxyphenylpyruvate dioxygenase. Type III tyrosinemia is the rarest of the three conditions, with only a few cases ever reported. Most of those cases have included intellectual disability and neurologic dysfunction.

== Diagnosis ==
=== Types ===
Type I tyrosinemia can be detected via blood tests for the presence of a fumarylacetoacetate metabolite, succinylacetone, which is considered a pathognomonic indicator for the disease.

Type II tyrosinemia can be detected via the presence of significantly elevated plasma tyrosine levels, and the diagnosis can be confirmed by detection of a mutation in TAT in cultured fibroblasts.

Type III tyrosinemia can be diagnosed by detection of a mutation in HPD in cultured fibroblasts.

Pathophysiology of metabolic disorders of tyrosine, resulting in elevated levels of tyrosine in blood.

== Treatment ==
Treatment varies depending on the specific type; a low-protein diet combined with the use of a specially engineered formula to supply protein is required in most cases. Experience with nitisinone has shown it to be effective, especially when started within the first month of life, and it is now the standard course of treatment. It is a 4-hydroxyphenylpyruvate dioxygenase inhibitor indicated for the treatment of hereditary tyrosinemia type 1 (HT-1) in combination with dietary restriction of tyrosine and phenylalanine. Liver transplant is indicated for patients with tyrosinemia type I who do not respond to nitisinone, as well as those with acute liver failure and hepatomas.

== See also ==
- Alkaptonuria
- Inborn error of metabolism
- Ochronosis
