= 3-hydroxyphenylacetate 6-hydroxylase =

Class of enzymes

Identifiers
- EC no.: 1.14.13.63
- CAS no.: 114705-01-0

Databases
- BRENDA: enzyme data
- ExPASy: NiceZyme view
- KEGG: enzyme entry
- MetaCyc: metabolic pathway
- Rhea: reactions
- PDB structures: RCSB PDB PDBe PDBsum
- Gene Ontology: AmiGO / QuickGO
Search
- PMC: articles
- PubMed: articles
- NCBI: proteins

3-hydroxyphenylacetate 6-hydroxylase (EC 1.14.13.63) is an enzyme that catalyzes the chemical reaction

3-hydroxyphenylacetic acid
+ NADH + H^{+}
O_{2}
H_{2}O
homogentisic acid
+ NAD^{+}

The four substrates of this enzyme are 3-hydroxyphenylacetic acid, reduced nicotinamide adenine dinucleotide (NADH), oxygen, and a proton. Its products are homogentisic acid, oxidised NAD^{+}, and water. Nicotinamide adenine dinucleotide phosphate can be used as an alternative cofactor.

This enzyme is a flavin-containing monooxygenase that uses molecular oxygen as oxidant and incorporates one of its atoms into the starting material. The systematic name of this enzyme class is 3-hydroxyphenylacetate,NAD(P)H:oxygen oxidoreductase (6-hydroxylating). This enzyme is also called 3-hydroxyphenylacetate 6-monooxygenase. It participates in styrene degradation.
