= Fumarylacetoacetate hydrolase =

FAH
Available structures
PDB	Ortholog search: PDBe RCSB
PDB	List of PDB id codes 1HYO, 1QCN, 1QCO, 1QQJ, 2HZY

Identifiers
- Aliases: FAH, Fumarylacetoacetase, fumarylacetoacetate hydrolase
- External IDs: OMIM: 613871; MGI: 95482; HomoloGene: 110; GeneCards: FAH; OMA:FAH - orthologs

Gene location (Human)
Chr.	Chromosome 15 (human)
Band	15q25.1	Start	80,152,490 bp
Band	15q25.1	End	80,186,946 bp

Gene location (Mouse)
Chr.	Chromosome 7 (mouse)
Band	7 D3|7 48.36 cM	Start	84,234,367 bp
Band	7 D3|7 48.36 cM	End	84,255,930 bp
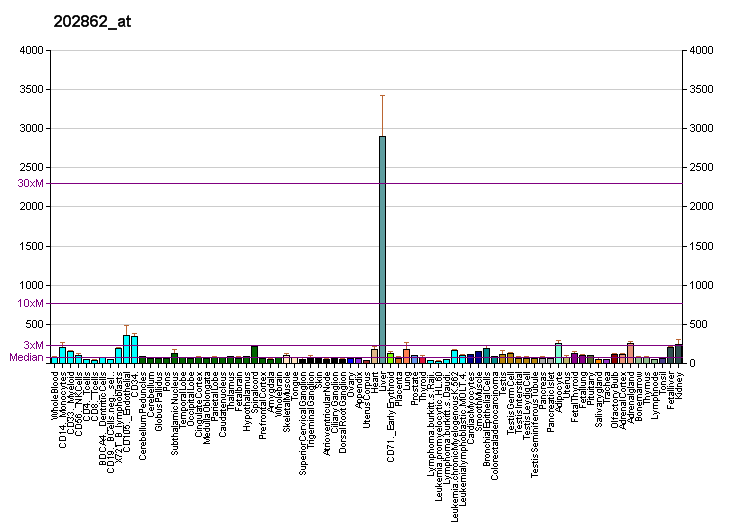
RNA expression pattern
Bgee	Human / Mouse (ortholog); Top expressed in: right lobe of liver; right adrenal gland; right adrenal cortex; left adrenal cortex; adipose tissue; abdominal fat; C1 segment; subcutaneous adipose tissue; stromal cell of endometrium; human kidney / Top expressed in: left lobe of liver; right kidney; human kidney; lactiferous gland; gallbladder; proximal tubule; brown adipose tissue; white adipose tissue; corneal stroma; subcutaneous adipose tissue; More reference expression data
BioGPS	More reference expression data
Gene ontology
Molecular function	fumarylacetoacetase activity; protein binding; catalytic activity; hydrolase activity; metal ion binding
Cellular component	cytosol; extracellular exosome
Biological process	aromatic amino acid family metabolic process; metabolism; L-phenylalanine catabolic process; arginine catabolic process; tyrosine catabolic process; homogentisate catabolic process
Sources:Amigo / QuickGO
Orthologs
Species	Human	Mouse
Entrez	2184	14085
Ensembl	ENSG00000103876	ENSMUSG00000030630
UniProt	P16930	P35505
RefSeq (mRNA)	NM_000137; NM_001374377; NM_001374380	NM_010176
RefSeq (protein)	NP_000128; NP_001361306; NP_001361309	NP_034306
Location (UCSC)	Chr 15: 80.15 – 80.19 Mb	Chr 7: 84.23 – 84.26 Mb
PubMed search
- Wikidata
View/Edit Human	View/Edit Mouse

Fumarylacetoacetase is an enzyme that in humans is encoded by the FAH gene located on chromosome 15. The enzyme is involved in the catabolism of the amino acid tyrosine in humans.

== Tissue distribution ==
The gene is mainly expressed in the liver and the kidney.

== Structure ==
The FAH gene is located on the chromosome 15q25.1 region and contains 14 exons. It encodes a protein that is 46kDa in height. Multiple isoforms of the protein have been discovered that arose from alternative splicing.

== Function ==
Fumarylacetoacetate hydrolase (FAH) is a protein homodimer which cleaves fumarylacetoacetic acid at its carbon-carbon bond during a hydrolysis reaction. As a critical enzyme in phenylalanine and tyrosine metabolism, 4-fumarylacetoacetate hydrolase catalyzes the final step in the catabolism of 4-fumarylacetoacetic acid, converting it into fumaric acid and acetoacetic acid. These hydrolytic reactions are essential during aromatic amino acid human metabolism. Furthermore, FAH does not share known protein sequence homologs with other nucleotides or amino acids.

fumarylacetoacetic acid
H_{2}O
fumaric acid
+
acetoacetic acid

== Reaction mechanism ==
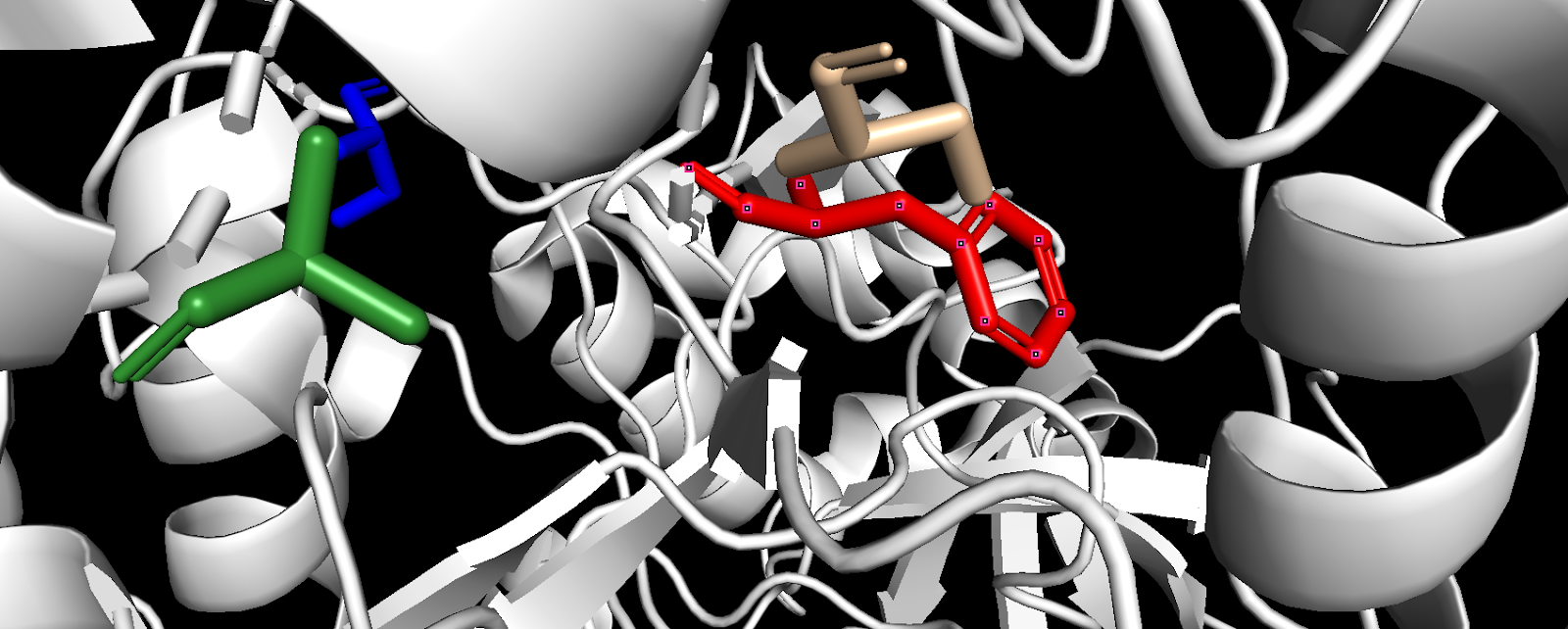
Model of the active site of 4-Fumarylacetoacetase bound to metal-ligand binding sites and a Fumarylacetoacetate analogue. Fumarylacetoacetate analogue (green), Mg^{2+}(Blue), Ca^{2+}(Red), substrate-coordinated residues (Beige)

The active site of FAH contains Ca^{2+} which acts to bind the substrate and a Glu-His-Water catalytic triad functions where the imidazole ring of His133 activates a nucleophilic water molecule to attack the carbon-carbon bond of fumarylacetoacetate, thus forming fumarate and acetoacetate. Similar to phenylalanine-associated pathways, the reaction molecular basis is critical in mammalian metabolism, as evidenced by the observed liver enzyme activity in FAH deficiency during hereditary tyrosinemia type 1. In humans, this enzyme is mainly expressed in the liver. FAH is among the amino acid hydroxylases. Tyrosine aminotransferase (TAT), 4-hydroxyphenylpyruvate dioxygenase (HPD), homogentisate 1,2-dioxygenase (HGD), phenylalanine-4-hydroxylase (PAH), maleylacetoacetate isomerase (GSTZ1), and other amino acid catabolic hydroxylases are coupled in the biological process of hydroxylases as well. The FAH subpathway constitutes a part of the main amino-acid L-phenylalanine degradation. For ingested phenylalanine, turnover for FAH protein synthesis is directly linked to treatment based methodology.

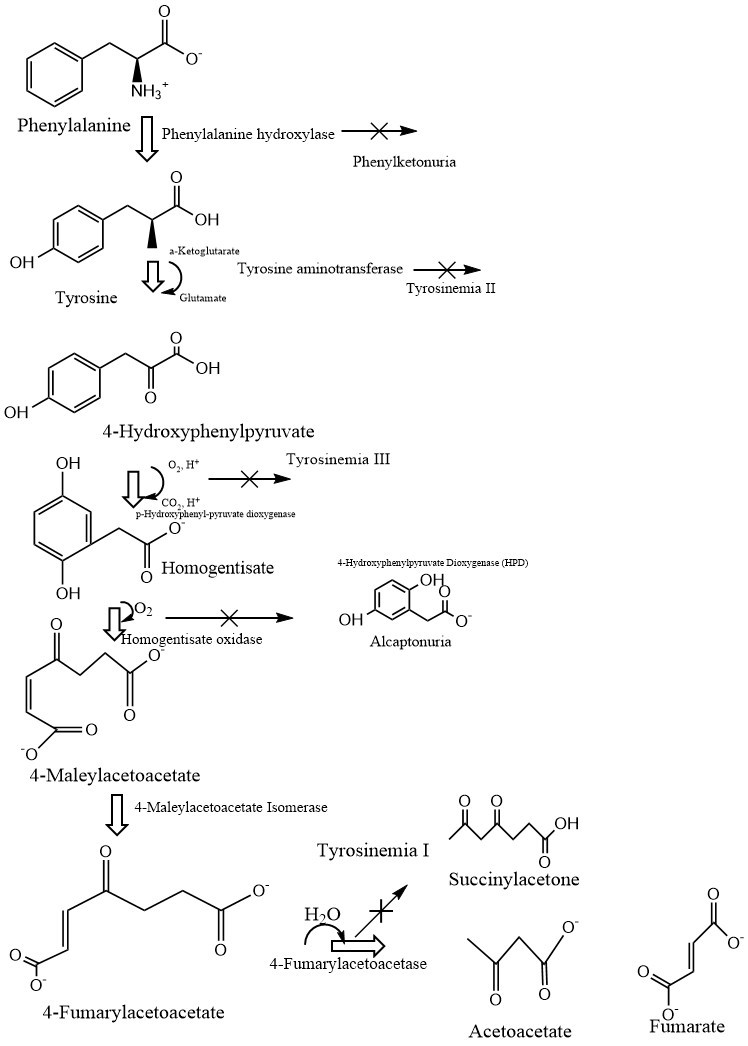
This image shows the conversion of 4-fumarylacetoacetate to fumarate and acetoacetate as well as the relationship to other phenylalanine breakdown pathways that catalyze each step and cofactors required.

== Clinical significance ==
=== Mutations ===
The activity of human liver fumarylacetoacetate fumarylhydrolase has been determined with fumarylacetoacetate as the substrate. As an inborn error of metabolism, tyrosinemia type I stems from a deficiency in the enzymatic catabolic pathway of fumarylacetoacetate hydrolase (FAH). Currently, the mutations reported include silent mutations, amino acid replacements within single base substitutions, nonsense codons, and splicing defects. Mutations spread across the FAH gene observes clusters of amino acid residues such as alanine and aspartic acid residues. Hereditary tyrosinemia type 1 is a metabolic disorder with an autosomal recessive mode of inheritance. The disease is caused by a deficiency of fumarylacetoacetate hydrolase (FAH), the last enzyme in the degradation pathway of tyrosine. Hereditary tyrosinemia type 1 manifests in either an acute or a chronic form. However, symptoms may appear in heterozygote mutations in the FAH gene, as documented in case of a 12‐year‐old American boy with chronic tyrosinemia type 1. Specifically, maternal alleles for codon 234 exhibit this mutation which changes a tryptophan to a glycine. This possibly suggests HT1 missense mutations also inhibiting enzymatic activity. This is also attributed to observed clustering between amino acid residue active sites 230 and 250 among hundreds of other mutations in the FAH gene. Currently, FAH gene correlation with HT1 does not associate clinical phenotype with genotype.

Possible disease symptom is the development of hereditary tyrosinemia type 1 (HT1). Caused by the lack of fumarylacetoacetate hydrolase (FAH), the last enzyme of the tyrosine catabolic pathway, HT 1 is inherited as a rare autosomal recessive disease with a prevalence in Europe of 1 : 50000. However, in isolated parts of Quebec's provinces, the frequency can be as high as 1 : 2000, with a carrier rate of 1:20 possibly due to a single founder mutation. FAH deficiency leads to an accumulation of alkylating metabolites that cause damage to the liver. The disorder presents as an acute, chronic or intermediate mild phenotype. The acute form manifests itself within the first half year and is characterized by liver failure, renal damage, and possibly death in the first year of life. The chronic form has an age of onset of more than one year after birth; rickets and progressive liver disease often lead to the development of hepatocellular carcinoma. Other symptoms can include renal tubular injury, hepatic necrosis, episodic weakness, seizures. Renal Fanconi syndrome and porphyric crises are also cited, in addition to liver and renal damage.

A complete FAH genotype has been previously established. All possible bands show two deleterious mutations. The effect of these mutations for the majority of the abnormalities on the FAH mRNA have been analysed. The identification of the gene defects on both alleles enables an initial genotype-phenotype analysis for chronic, subacute and acute HT 1 patients.

=== Treatment ===
Currently, there is no cure for tyrosinemia type 1. Diagnosed individuals need special dietary restriction all throughout life for the amino acids, phenylalanine and tyrosine. Affected individuals may also be treated with a FDA-approved medication called nitisinone. Recommended treatment should begin as early as possible when the condition is diagnosed. Bacterial inhibition assay, such as the Guthrie Test, can screen newborns for FAH deficiency in addition to increased phenylalanine levels. Other diagnostic methods include measurements with tandem mass spectrometry fragmentation. Some individuals require a liver transplant if liver disease progresses into advanced development before dietary treatment begins.
