= Tyrosine (data page) =

Chemical data page

The complete data for Tyrosine
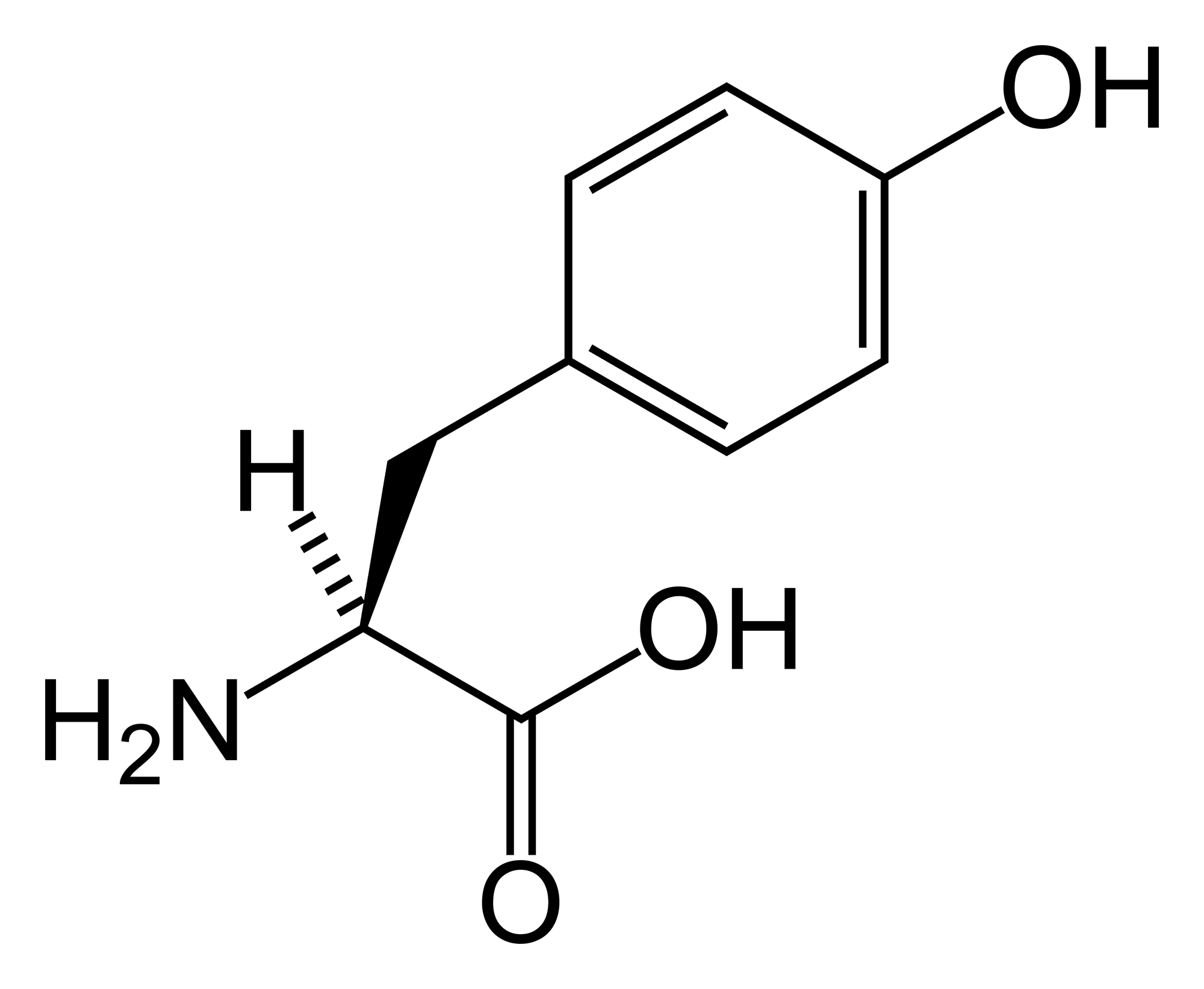
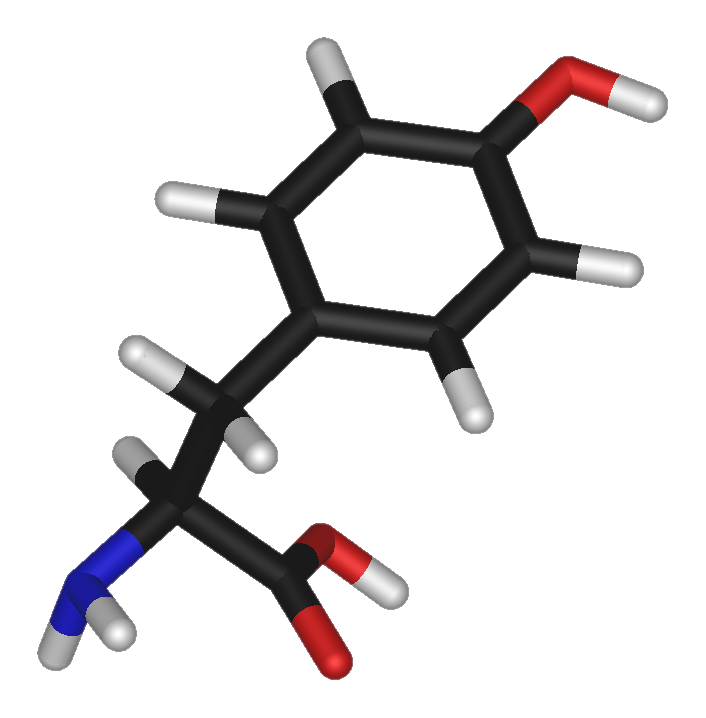
General information
Chemical formula: C_{9}H_{11}NO_{3}
Molar mass: 181.19 g·mol^{−1}
Systematic name:
(S)-2-Amino-3-(4-hydroxy-phenyl)-propanoic acid
Abbreviations: Y, Tyr
Synonyms:
none
Database data
SMILES: Oc1ccc(CC(N)C(=O)O)cc1
InChI=1/C9H11NO3/c10-8(9(12)13)5-6-1-3-7(11)4-2-6/h1-4,8,11H,5,10H2,(H,12,13)/f/h12H

ATC: N/A	CAS: 60-18-4	DrugBank: N/A	EINECS: 200-460-4 ^{a}	PubChem: 71098 (D)^{a}, 1153 (L)^{a}

Physical properties

Structure	Crystal data	Spectral data: UV-Vis / IR / NMR / MS: Masses of main fragments: GMD MS Spectrum

Phase behavior	Solid properties ρ_{solid}: 1.456 g.cm^{−3} T_{m}: 343 °C	Liquid properties	Gas properties

Hazard properties

MSDS N/A	Main hazards: N/A	NFPA 704	Flash point: N/A	RTECS number: N/A

Chemical properties

XLogP: -1.87	pI: 5.66	pK_{a}: 2.24, 9.04, 10.10	Tautomers: 2	Hydrogen bond: donor - 3; acceptor - 4

Pharmacological properties

This box:
- Except where noted otherwise, data relate to Standard temperature and pressure.
- Reliability of data general note.
