= Hipposudoric acid =

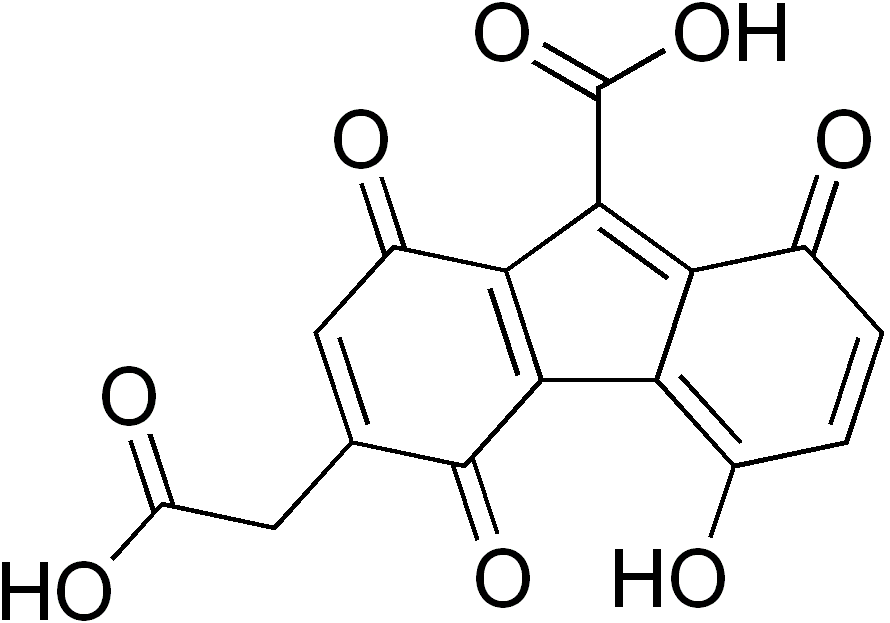

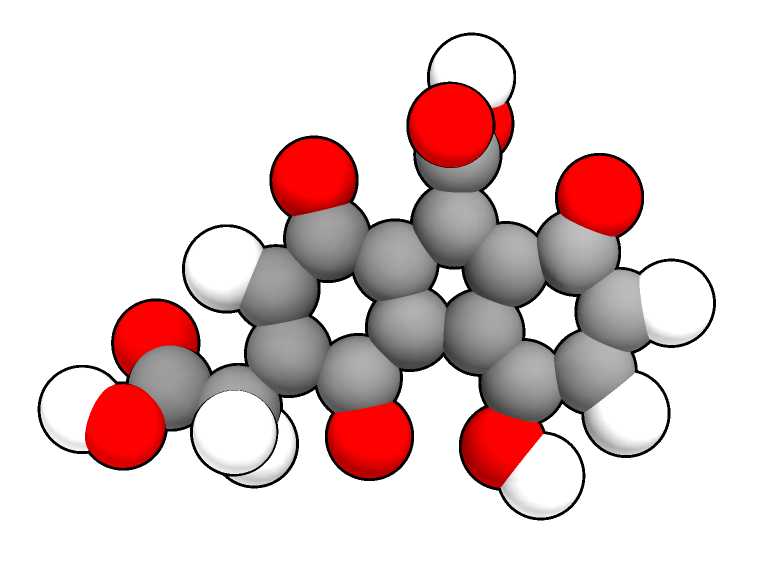

Names
- Preferred IUPAC name 3-(Carboxymethyl)-5-hydroxy-1,4,8-trioxo-4,8-dihydro-1H-fluorene-9-carboxylic acid

Identifiers
CAS Number	851367-73-2
3D model (JSmol)	Interactive image
ChemSpider	26546345
PubChem CID	71308217
UNII	T8NK975Z5X
CompTox Dashboard (EPA)	DTXSID90745438
- InChI: InChI=1S/C16H8O8/c17-6-1-2-7(18)11-10(6)13-12(14(11)16(23)24)8(19)3-5(15(13)22)4-9(20)21/h1-3,17H,4H2,(H,20,21)(H,23,24) Key: JTNHFMSBPHUJFI-UHFFFAOYSA-N
- SMILES: O=C1C=CC(O)=C2C(C(C(CC(O)=O)=CC3=O)=O)=C3C(C(O)=O)=C12

Properties
Chemical formula	C_{16}H_{8}O_{8}
Molar mass	328.232 g·mol^{−1}
Appearance	Red
- Except where otherwise noted, data are given for materials in their standard state (at 25 °C [77 °F], 100 kPa). verify (what is ?) Infobox references

Hipposudoric acid is a red pigment found in the skin secretions of the hippopotamus; although the secretions are often known as "blood sweat" (thus the name "hipposudoric", referring to "hippo sweat"), they are neither blood nor sweat.

Like its orange-colored analog norhipposudoric acid, hipposudoric acid functions both as a natural sunscreen and as an antimicrobial agent. It is derived from the oxidative dimerization of homogentisic acid.

It has been both widely and falsely reported that hipposudoric acid colors hippo milk pink. This is not the case; hippo milk is white or beige in color.

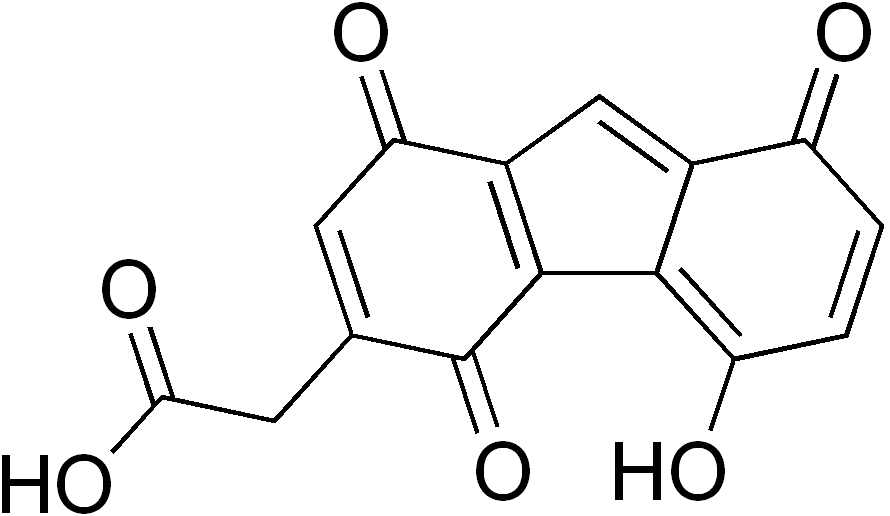
Norhipposudoric acid
