= Tyrosine phenol-lyase =

tyrosine phenol-lyase

Identifiers
- EC no.: 4.1.99.2
- CAS no.: 9059-31-8

Databases
- IntEnz: IntEnz view
- BRENDA: BRENDA entry
- ExPASy: NiceZyme view
- KEGG: KEGG entry
- MetaCyc: metabolic pathway
- PRIAM: profile
- PDB structures: RCSB PDB PDBe PDBsum
- Gene Ontology: AmiGO / QuickGO
Search
- PMC: articles
- PubMed: articles
- NCBI: proteins

The enzyme tyrosine phenol-lyase (EC 4.1.99.2) catalyzes the chemical reaction

L-tyrosine + H_{2}O $\rightleftharpoons$ phenol + pyruvate + NH_{3}

This enzyme belongs to the family of lyases, specifically in the "catch-all" class of carbon-carbon lyases. The systematic name of this enzyme class is L-tyrosine phenol-lyase (deaminating; pyruvate-forming). Other names in common use include beta-tyrosinase, and L-tyrosine phenol-lyase (deaminating). This enzyme participates in tyrosine metabolism and nitrogen metabolism. It employs one cofactor, pyridoxal phosphate.

== Structural studies ==
As of late 2007, five structures have been solved for this class of enzyme, with PDB accession codes 1C7G, 1TPL, 2EZ1, 2EZ2, and 2TPL.
