= Fumarylacetoacetic acid =

Names
- Preferred IUPAC name (2E)-4,6-Dioxooct-2-enedioic acid

Identifiers
CAS Number	28613-33-4
3D model (JSmol)	Interactive image
ChemSpider	4444081
MeSH	Fumarylacetoacetate
PubChem CID	5280398
UNII	FM3BV7K438
CompTox Dashboard (EPA)	DTXSID20901388
- InChI: InChI=1S/C8H8O6/c9-5(1-2-7(11)12)3-6(10)4-8(13)14/h1-2H,3-4H2,(H,11,12)(H,13,14)/b2-1+ Key: GACSIVHAIFQKTC-OWOJBTEDSA-N
- SMILES: O=C(\C=C\C(=O)O)CC(=O)CC(=O)O

Properties
Chemical formula	C_{8}H_{8}O_{6}
Molar mass	200.146 g·mol^{−1}
- Except where otherwise noted, data are given for materials in their standard state (at 25 °C [77 °F], 100 kPa). Infobox references

Fumarylacetoacetic acid (fumarylacetoacetate) is an intermediate in the metabolism of tyrosine. It is formed through the conversion of 4-maleylacetoacetic acid into fumarylacetoacetic acid by the enzyme maleylacetoacetate isomerase. Fumarylacetoacetic acid is hydrolyzed by the enzyme fumarylacetoacetate hydrolase (FAH), producing acetoacetate and fumarate. These compounds may then enter various other metabolic pathways.

== Biosynthesis ==
The amino acid tyrosine is metabolised in a series of reactions, one of which is catalysed by homogentisate 1,2-dioxygenase. This converts the intermediate homogentisic acid into 4-maleylacetoacetic acid.

The enzyme maleylacetoacetate isomerase subsequently converts 4-maleylacetoacetic acid to its geometric isomer, fumarylacetoacetic acid.

4-Maleylacetoacetic acid
Fumarylacetoacetic acid

== Metabolism ==
The enzyme fumarylacetoacetate hydrolase (FAH) cleaves fumarylacetoacetic acid at its carbon-carbon bond during a hydrolysis reaction. This is the final step in phenylalanine and tyrosine metabolism, yielding fumaric acid and acetoacetic acid. These hydrolytic reactions are essential during aromatic amino acid metabolism in humans.

fumarylacetoacetic acid
H_{2}O
fumaric acid
+
acetoacetic acid

== Clinical significance ==
Fumarylacetoacetate may accumulate in patients with Tyrosinemia type I, in which there is a deficiency of the FAH enzyme. In this disease, fumarylacetoacetate and precursors in the catabolism of tyrosine, including maleylacetoacetic acid, succinylacetone, and homogentisic acid.
