= Tyrosine =

Amino acid

- Skeletal formula of the L-isomer Skeletal formula of L-tyrosine

- L-Tyrosine at physiological pH

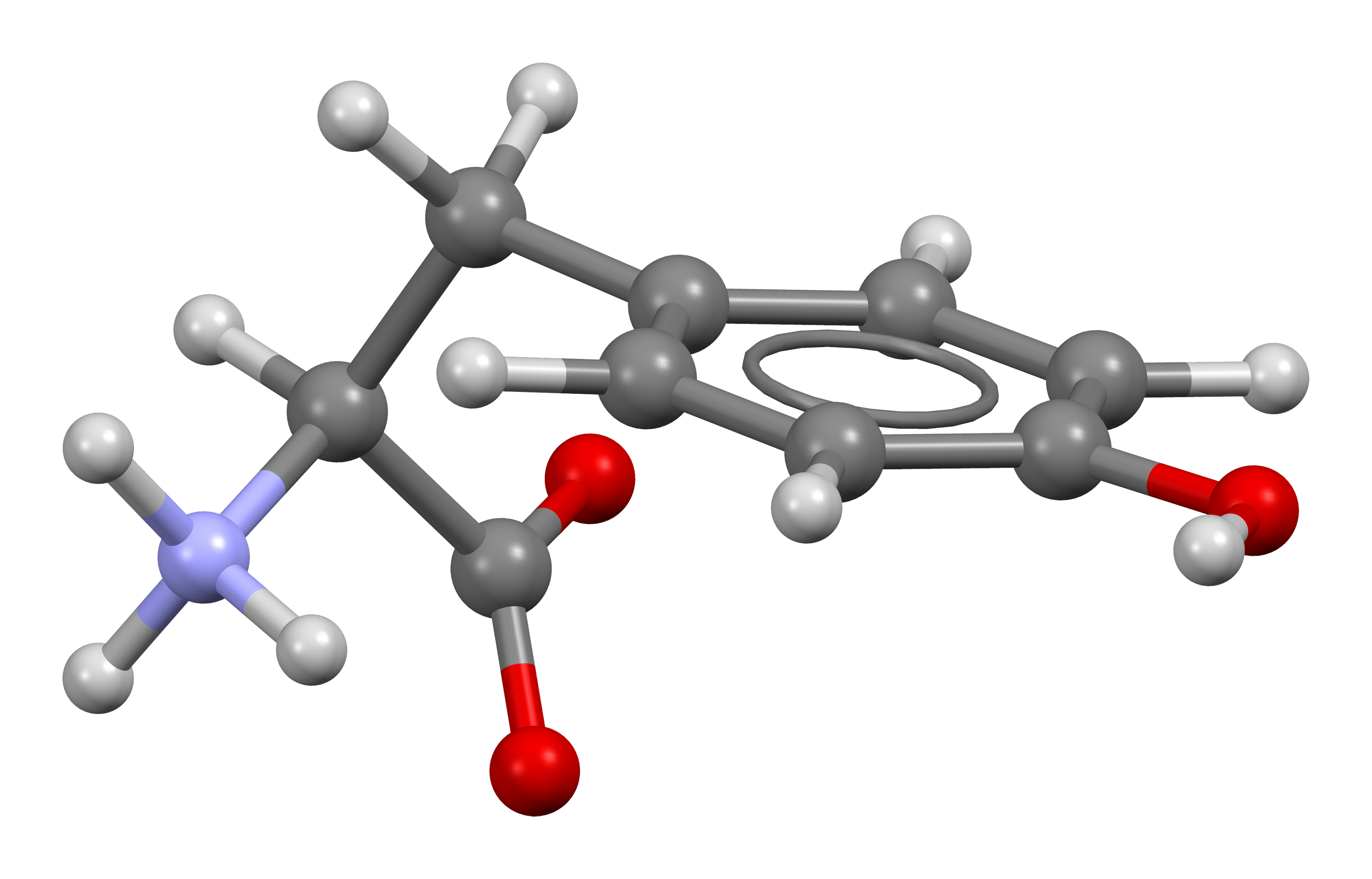
ball-and-stick model
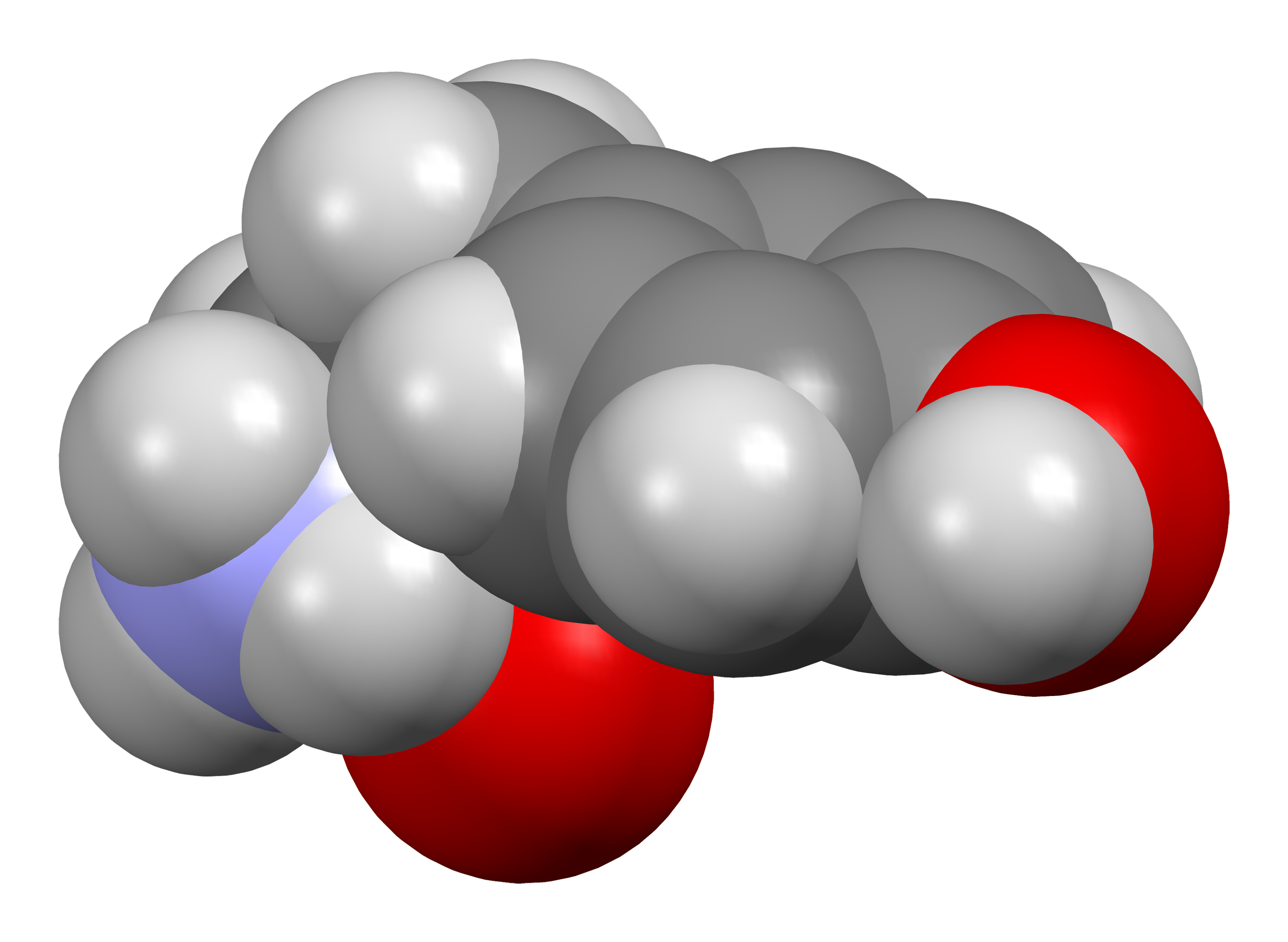
space-filling model

Names
- IUPAC name Tyrosine
- Systematic IUPAC name 2-Amino-3-(4-hydroxyphenyl)propanoic acid

Identifiers
CAS Number	60-18-4 (L)
3D model (JSmol)	Interactive image; Zwitterion: Interactive image
ChEBI	CHEBI:17895
ChEMBL	ChEMBL925
ChemSpider	5833
DrugBank	DB00135
ECHA InfoCard	100.000.419
IUPHAR/BPS	4791
KEGG	C00082
PubChem CID	6057
UNII	42HK56048U
CompTox Dashboard (EPA)	DTXSID1023730
- InChI: InChI=1S/C9H11NO3/c10-8(9(12)13)5-6-1-3-7(11)4-2-6/h1-4,8,11H,5,10H2,(H,12,13)/t8-/m0/s1 Key: OUYCCCASQSFEME-QMMMGPOBSA-N; Key: OUYCCCASQSFEME-UHFFFAOYSA-N; Key: OUYCCCASQSFEME-MRVPVSSYSA-N
- SMILES: N[C@@H](Cc1ccc(O)cc1)C(O)=O; Zwitterion: [NH3+][C@@H](Cc1ccc(O)cc1)C([O-])=O

Properties
Chemical formula	C_{9}H_{11}NO_{3}
Molar mass	181.191 g·mol^{−1}
Appearance	white solid
Solubility in water	45.3 mg/100 mL
Acidity (pK_{a})	2.20 (carboxylate), 9.21 (amine), 10.46 (phenol)
Magnetic susceptibility (χ)	−105.3·10^{−6} cm^{3}/mol

Hazards
NFPA 704 (fire diamond)	1 1 0

Supplementary data page
- Tyrosine (data page)
- Except where otherwise noted, data are given for materials in their standard state (at 25 °C [77 °F], 100 kPa). Infobox references

Tyrosine ball and stick model spinning

L-Tyrosine or tyrosine (symbol Tyr or Y) or 4-hydroxyphenylalanine is one of the 20 standard amino acids that are used by cells to synthesize proteins. It is a conditionally essential amino acid with a polar side group. The word "tyrosine" is from the Greek tyrós, meaning 'cheese', as it was first discovered in 1846 by German chemist Justus von Liebig in the protein casein from cheese. It is called tyrosyl when referred to as a functional group or side chain. While tyrosine is generally classified as a hydrophobic amino acid, it is more hydrophilic than phenylalanine. It is encoded by the codons UAC and UAU in messenger RNA.

The one-letter symbol Y was assigned to tyrosine for being alphabetically nearest of those letters available. Note that T was assigned to the structurally simpler threonine, U was avoided for its similarity with V for valine, W was assigned to tryptophan, while X was reserved for undetermined or atypical amino acids. The mnemonic tYrosine was also proposed.

== Functions ==
Aside from being a proteinogenic amino acid, tyrosine has a special role by virtue of the phenol functionality. Its hydroxy group is able to form the ester linkage, with phosphate in particular. Phosphate groups are transferred to tyrosine residues by way of protein tyrosine kinases. This is one of the post-translational modifications. Phosphorylated tyrosine occurs in proteins that are part of signal transduction processes. Similar functionality is also presented in serine and threonine, whose side chains have a hydroxy group, but are alcohols. Phosphorylation of these three amino acids' moieties (including tyrosine) creates a negative charge on their ends, which is greater than the negative charge of the only negatively charged aspartic and glutamic acids. Phosphorylated proteins keep these same properties—which are useful for more reliable protein-protein interactions—by means of phosphotyrosine, phosphoserine and phosphothreonine.

Binding sites for a signalling phosphoprotein may be diverse in their chemical structure.

Phosphorylation of the hydroxyl group can change the activity of the target protein, or may form part of a signaling cascade via SH2 domain binding.

A tyrosine residue also plays an important role in photosynthesis. In chloroplasts (photosystem II), it acts as an electron donor in the reduction of oxidized chlorophyll. In this process, it loses the hydrogen atom of its phenolic OH-group. This radical is subsequently reduced in the photosystem II by the four core manganese clusters.

== Dietary requirements and sources ==
The Dietary Reference Intake for tyrosine is usually estimated together with phenylalanine. It varies depending on an estimate method, however the ideal proportion of these two amino acids is considered to be 60:40 (phenylalanine:tyrosine) as a human body has such composition. Tyrosine, which can also be synthesized in the body from phenylalanine, is found in many high-protein food products such as meat, fish, cheese, cottage cheese, milk, yogurt, peanuts, almonds, pumpkin seeds, sesame seeds, soy protein and lima beans. For example, the white of an egg has about 250 mg per egg, while beef, lamb, pork, tuna, salmon, chicken, and turkey contain about 500–1000 mg per 3 ounces (85 g) portion.

== Biosynthesis ==
In plants and most microorganisms, tyrosine is produced via prephenate, an intermediate on the shikimate pathway. Prephenate is oxidatively decarboxylated with retention of the hydroxyl group to give p-hydroxyphenylpyruvate, which is transaminated using glutamate as the nitrogen source to give tyrosine and α-ketoglutarate.

Plant biosynthesis of tyrosine from prephenate.

Mammals synthesize tyrosine from the essential amino acid phenylalanine (Phe), which is derived from food. The conversion of Phe to Tyr is catalyzed by the enzyme phenylalanine hydroxylase, a monooxygenase. This enzyme catalyzes the reaction causing the addition of a hydroxyl group to the end of the 6-carbon aromatic ring of phenylalanine, such that it becomes tyrosine.

== Metabolism ==
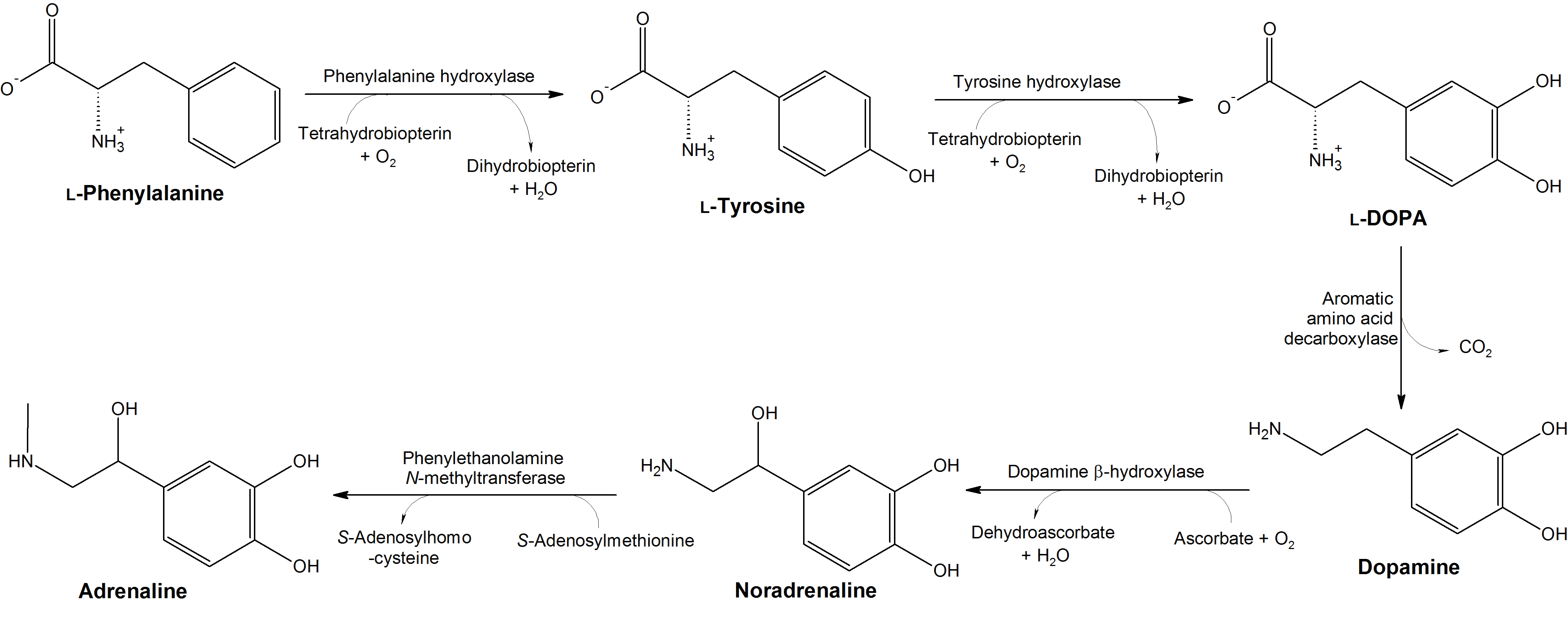
Conversion of phenylalanine and tyrosine to its biologically important derivatives.

=== Phosphorylation and sulfation ===
Some of the tyrosine residues can be tagged (at the hydroxyl group) with a phosphate group (phosphorylated) by protein kinases. In its phosphorylated form, tyrosine is called phosphotyrosine. Tyrosine phosphorylation is considered to be one of the key steps in signal transduction and regulation of enzymatic activity. Phosphotyrosine can be detected through specific antibodies. Tyrosine residues may also be modified by the addition of a sulfate group, a process known as tyrosine sulfation. Tyrosine sulfation is catalyzed by tyrosylprotein sulfotransferase (TPST). Like the phosphotyrosine antibodies mentioned above, antibodies have recently been described that specifically detect sulfotyrosine.

=== Precursor to neurotransmitters and hormones ===
In dopaminergic cells in the brain, tyrosine is converted to L-DOPA by the enzyme tyrosine hydroxylase (TH). TH is the rate-limiting enzyme involved in the synthesis of the neurotransmitter dopamine. Dopamine can then be converted into other catecholamines, such as norepinephrine (noradrenaline) and epinephrine (adrenaline).

The thyroid hormones triiodothyronine (T_{3}) and thyroxine (T_{4}) in the colloid of the thyroid are also derived from tyrosine.

Biosynthetic pathways for catecholamines and trace amines in the human brain
Tyrosine is a precursor to trace amine compounds and the catecholamines.

=== Precursor to other compounds ===
The latex of Papaver somniferum, the opium poppy, has been shown to convert tyrosine into the alkaloid morphine and the bio-synthetic pathway has been established from tyrosine to morphine by using Carbon-14 radio-labelled tyrosine to trace the in-vivo synthetic route.Tyrosine ammonia lyase (TAL) is an enzyme in the natural phenols biosynthesis pathway. It transforms L-tyrosine into p-coumaric acid. Tyrosine is also the precursor to the pigment melanin. Tyrosine (or its precursor phenylalanine) is needed to synthesize the benzoquinone structure which forms part of coenzyme Q10.

=== Degradation ===
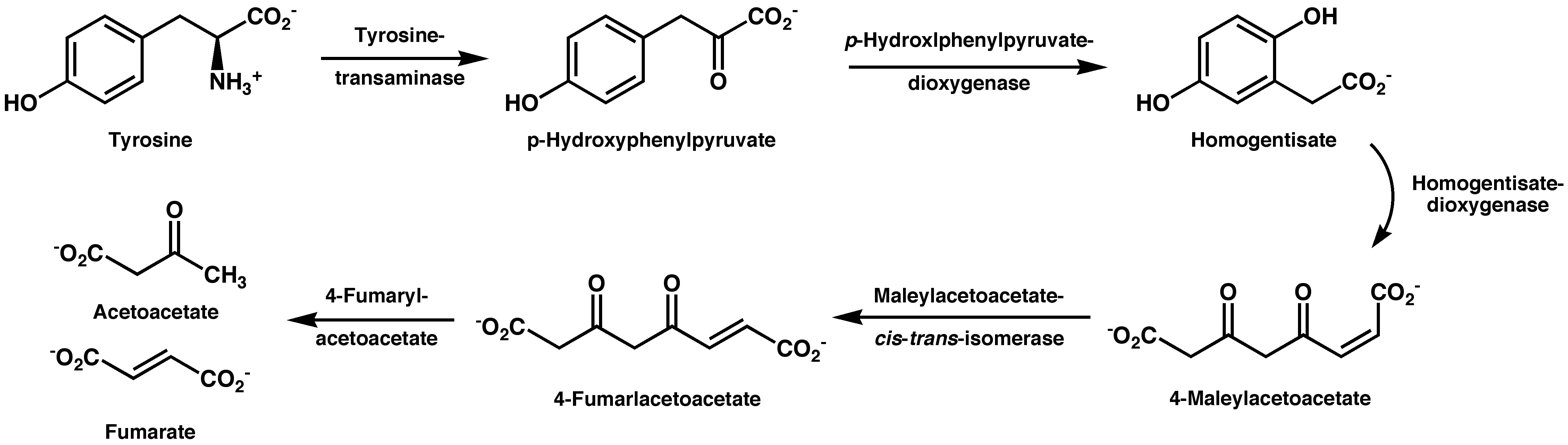
The decomposition of tyrosine to acetoacetate and fumarate. Two dioxygenases are necessary for the decomposition path. The end products can then enter into the citric acid cycle.

The decomposition of L-tyrosine (syn. para-hydroxyphenylalanine) begins with an α-ketoglutarate dependent transamination through the tyrosine transaminase to para-hydroxyphenylpyruvate. The positional description para, abbreviated p, mean that the hydroxyl group and side chain on the phenyl ring are across from each other (see the illustration below).

The next oxidation step catalyzes by p-hydroxyphenylpyruvate dioxygenase and splitting off CO_{2} homogentisate (2,5-dihydroxyphenyl-1-acetate). In order to split the aromatic ring of homogentisate, a further dioxygenase, homogentisate 1,2-dioxygenase is required. Thereby, through the incorporation of a further O_{2} molecule, maleylacetoacetate is created.

Fumarylacetoacetate is created by maleylacetoacetate cis-trans-isomerase through rotation of the carboxyl group created from the hydroxyl group via oxidation. This cis-trans-isomerase contains glutathione as a coenzyme. Fumarylacetoacetate is finally split by the enzyme fumarylacetoacetate hydrolase through the addition of a water molecule.

Thereby fumarate (also a metabolite of the citric acid cycle) and acetoacetate (3-ketobutyroate) are liberated. Acetoacetate is a ketone body, which is activated with succinyl-CoA, and thereafter it can be converted into acetyl-CoA, which in turn can be oxidized by the citric acid cycle or be used for fatty acid synthesis.

Phloretic acid is also a urinary metabolite of tyrosine in rats.

== Ortho- and meta-tyrosine ==
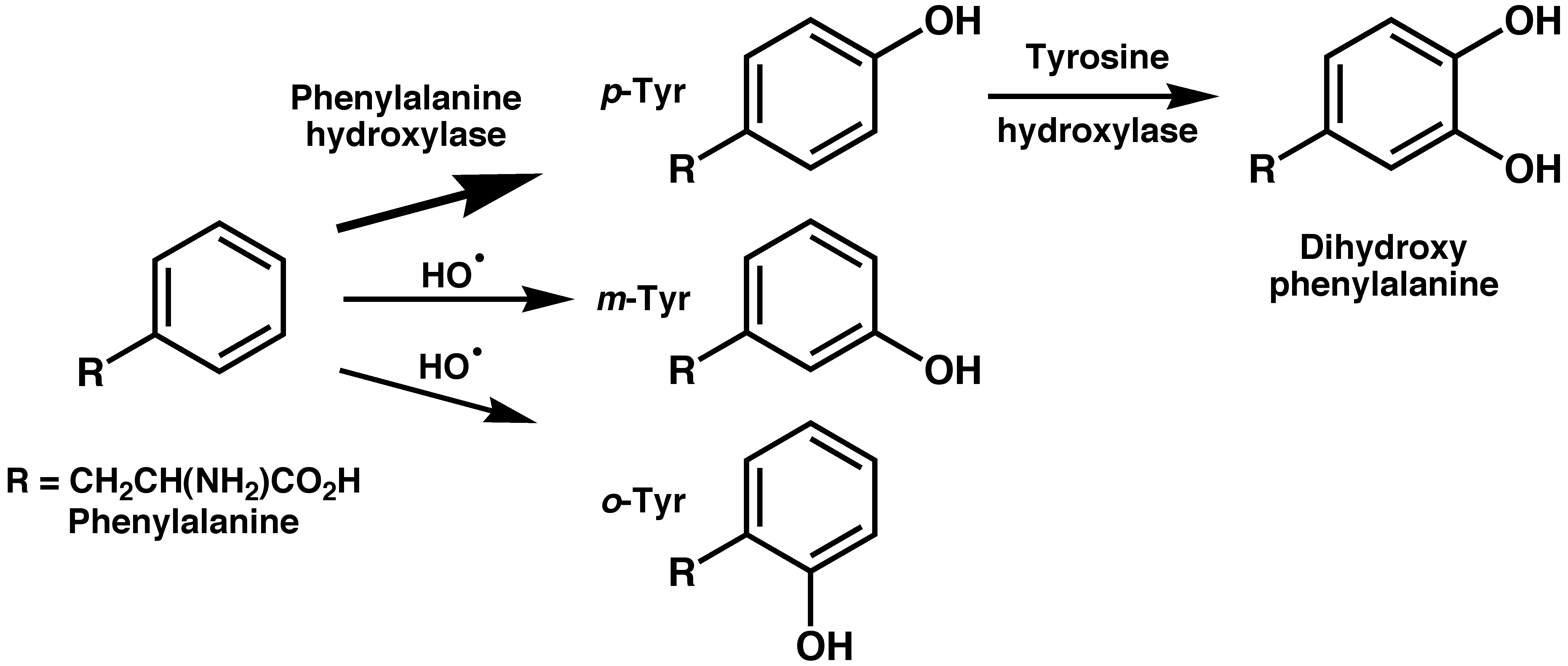
Enzymatic oxidation of tyrosine by phenylalanine hydroxylase (top) and non-enyzmatic oxidation by hydroxyl free radicals (middle and bottom).

Three structural isomers of L-tyrosine are known. In addition to the common amino acid L-tyrosine, which is the para isomer (para-tyr, p-tyr or 4-hydroxyphenylalanine), there are two additional regioisomers, namely meta-tyrosine (also known as 3-hydroxyphenylalanine, L-m-tyrosine, and m-tyr) and ortho-tyrosine (o-tyr or 2-hydroxyphenylalanine), that occur in nature. The m-tyr and o-tyr isomers, which are rare, arise through non-enzymatic free-radical hydroxylation of phenylalanine under conditions of oxidative stress. They are toxic to both animals and plants.

== Medical use ==
Tyrosine is a precursor to neurotransmitters and increases plasma neurotransmitter levels (particularly dopamine and norepinephrine), but has little if any effect on mood in normal subjects.

A 2015 systematic review found that "tyrosine loading acutely counteracts decrements in working memory and information processing that are induced by demanding situational conditions such as extreme weather or cognitive load" and therefore "tyrosine may benefit healthy individuals exposed to demanding situational conditions".

== Industrial synthesis ==
L-Tyrosine is used in pharmaceuticals, dietary supplements, and food additives. Two methods were formerly used to manufacture L-tyrosine. The first involves the extraction of the desired amino acid from protein hydrolysates using a chemical approach. The second utilizes enzymatic synthesis from phenolics, pyruvate, and ammonia through the use of tyrosine phenol-lyase. Advances in genetic engineering and the advent of industrial fermentation have shifted the synthesis of L-tyrosine to the use of engineered strains of E. coli.

== See also ==
- Albinism
- Alkaptonuria
- Betalain
- Iodinated tyrosine derivatives
- Pauly reaction
- Tyramine
- Tyrosine sulfation
- Tyrosinemia
