= Alkaptonuria =

- Other names: Black urine disease, black bone disease, alcaptonuria
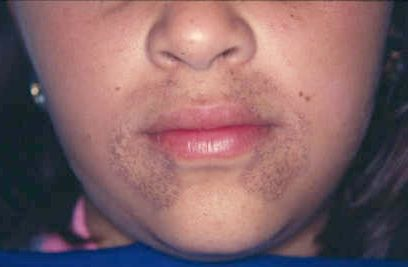
- Pigmentation of the face in alkaptonuria
- Specialty: Endocrinology
- Frequency: 0.0005%

Alkaptonuria is a rare inherited genetic disease which is caused by a mutation in the HGD gene for the enzyme homogentisate 1,2-dioxygenase (EC 1.13.11.5); if a person inherits an abnormal copy from both parents (it is a recessive condition), the body accumulates an intermediate substance called homogentisic acid in the blood and tissues. Homogentisic acid and its oxidized form alkapton are excreted in the urine, giving it an unusually dark color. The accumulating homogentisic acid causes damage to cartilage (ochronosis, leading to osteoarthritis) and heart valves, as well as precipitating as kidney stones and stones in other organs. Symptoms usually develop in people over 30 years old, although the dark discoloration of the urine is present from birth.

Apart from treatment of the complications (such as pain relief and joint replacement for the cartilage damage), the drug nitisinone has been found to suppress homogentisic acid production, and research is ongoing as to whether it can improve symptoms. Alkaptonuria is a rare disease; it occurs in one in 250,000 people, but is more common in Slovakia and the Dominican Republic.

== Signs and symptoms ==
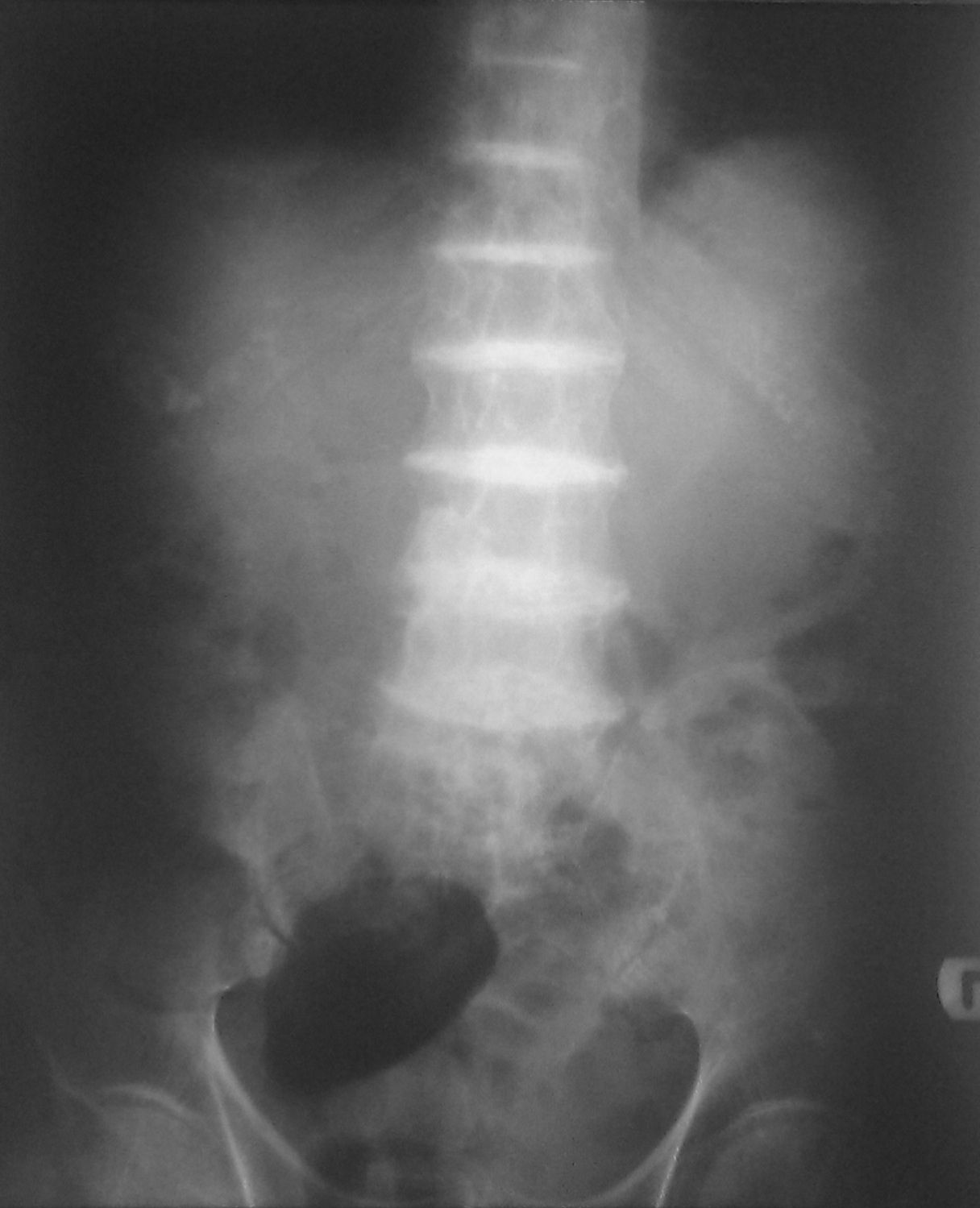
Intervertebral discs calcification due to ochronosis

Patients with alkaptonuria are asymptomatic as children or young adults, but their urine may turn brown or even inky black if collected and left exposed to open air. Pigmentation may be noted in the cartilage of the ear and other cartilage, and the sclera and corneal limbus of the eye.

After the age of 30, people begin to develop pain in the weight-bearing joints of the spine, hips, and knees. The pain can be severe to the point that interferes with activities of daily living and may affect the ability to work. Joint-replacement surgery (hip and shoulder) is often necessary at a relatively young age. In the longer term, the involvement of the spinal joints leads to reduced movement of the rib cage and can affect breathing. Bone mineral density may be affected, increasing the risk of bone fractures, and rupture of tendons and muscles may occur. While the patient is alive, their skeleton literally turns black. Surgeons operating on AKU patients for joint replacements are often shocked to find the hip, knee, or spinal bones stained pitch-black due to decades of polymerized HGA deposits.

Valvular heart disease, mainly calcification and regurgitation of the aortic and mitral valves, may occur, and in severe and progressive cases, valve replacement may be necessary. Irregularities in the heart rhythm and heart failure affect a significant proportion of people with alkaptonuria (40% and 10%, respectively). Hearing loss affects 40% of people. Also, a propensity to developing kidney stones exists, and eventually also gallstones and stones in the prostate and salivary glands (sialolithiasis) can occur.

== Pathophysiology ==
Chemical skeletal formula of homogentisic acid, which accumulates in the body fluids of people with alkaptonuria.

All people carry in their DNA two copies (one received from each parent) of the gene HGD, which contains the genetic information to produce the enzyme homogentisate 1,2-dioxygenase (HGD) which can normally be found in numerous tissues in the body (liver, kidney, small intestine, colon, and prostate). In people with alkaptonuria, both copies of the gene contain abnormalities that mean that the body cannot produce an adequately functioning enzyme. HGD mutations are generally found in certain parts (exons 6, 8, 10, and 13), but a total of over 100 abnormalities has been described throughout the gene. The normal HGD enzyme is a hexamer (it has six subunits) that are organized in two groups of three (two trimers) and contains an iron atom. Different mutations may affect the structure, function, or solubility of the enzyme. Very occasionally, the disease appears to be transmitted in an autosomal-dominant fashion, where a single abnormal copy of HGD from a single parent is associated with alkaptonuria; other mechanisms or defects in other genes possibly are responsible in those cases.

Pathophysiology of alkaptonuria (AKU) is due to the absence of functional homogentisate dioxygenase (HGD) in the liver.

The HGD enzyme is involved in the metabolism (chemical processing) of the aromatic amino acids phenylalanine and tyrosine. Normally, these enter the bloodstream through protein-containing food and the natural turnover of protein in the body. Tyrosine is specifically required for a number of functions, such as hormones (e.g. thyroxine, the thyroid hormone), melanin (the dark pigment in the skin and hair), and certain proteins, but the vast majority (over 95%) is unused and is metabolized through a group of enzymes that eventually generate acetoacetate and malate. In alkaptonuria, the HGD enzyme cannot metabolize the homogentisic acid (generated from tyrosine) into 4-maleylacetoacetate, and homogentisic acid levels in the blood are 100-fold higher than would normally be expected, despite the fact that a substantial amount is eliminated into the urine by the kidneys.

The homogentisic acid is converted to the related substance benzoquinone acetic acid which forms polymers that resemble the skin pigment melanin. These are deposited in the collagen, a connective tissue protein, of particular tissues such as cartilage. This process is called ochronosis (as the tissue looks ochre); ochronotic tissue is stiffened and unusually brittle, impairing its normal function and causing damage.

== Diagnosis ==
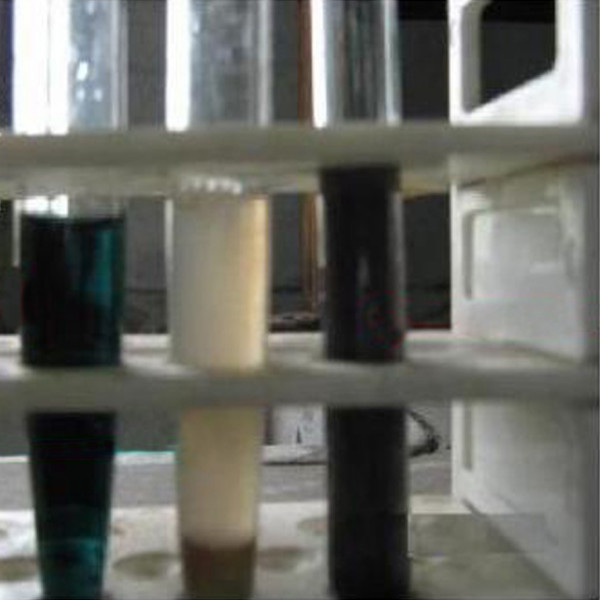
Urine of a 4-month-old baby with dark urine (on the left) after 10% ammonia and 3% silver nitrate were added. The tube in the middle is a normal control. Color change on alkalinization is not a specific test, and confirmatory investigations are needed.

If the diagnosis of alkaptonuria is suspected, it can be confirmed or excluded by collecting urine for 24 hours and determining the amount of homogentisic acid by means of chromatography. No assay of HGA in blood has been validated. The Genetic Testing Registry is used for maintaining information about the genetic test for alkaptonuria.

The severity of the symptoms and response to treatment can be quantified through a validated questionnaire titled the AKU Severity Score Index. This assigns scores to the presence of particular symptoms and features, such as the presence of eye and skin pigmentation, joint pain, heart problems, and organ stones.

== Treatment ==
In 2012 the AKU Society formed a consortium called DevelopAKUre to prove that nitisinone, a drug already approved for treating another rare disease, hereditary tyrosinaemia type-1, could be repurposed to treat AKU.

The DevelopAKUre trials concluded in 2019 found that nitisinone substantially reduced homogentisic acid (HGA)) levels in people with AKU. In the SONIA 2 randomized conrolled trait, a daily 10mg dose of nitisnone reduced urinary HGA excretion by 99.7% after 12 months. After 48 months, patients receiving nitisinone also had a significantly smaller increase in their alkaptonuria severity scores than those who received no treatment, indicating slower disease progression. In 2020, the European Medicines Agency and the European Commission approved the use of nitisinone for treating AKU making the treatment available to patients across the Europe and the UK.

Nitisinone has revolutionised the treatment of AKU, however it can lead to a condition known as hypertyrosinaemia caused by elevated levels of the amino acid tyrosine. Hypertyrosinaemia can lead to serious symptoms including corneal keratopathy, dermal toxicity, neurodevelopment delay issues in children, and alterations of wider metabolism. There is currently no effective treatment for hypertyrosinaemia other than limiting protein intake. Due to the potential side-effects of nitisinone treatment it is currently only prescribed to children aged 16 and above in Europe and patients will then have to follow a protein restricted diet and closely manage their tyrosine levels through frequent monitoring.

== Prognosis ==
Alkaptonuria does not appear to affect life expectancy, although the latest study on the topic is from 1985. The main impact is on quality of life; many people with alkaptonuria have disabling symptoms such as pain, poor sleep, and breathing symptoms. These generally start in the fourth decade. The typical age at requiring joint replacement surgery is 50–55 years.

== Epidemiology ==
In most ethnic groups, the prevalence of alkaptonuria is between 1:100,000 and 1:250,000. In Slovakia and the Dominican Republic, the disease is much more common, with prevalence estimated at 1:19,000 people. As for Slovakia, this is not the result of a single mutation, but due to a group of 12 mutations in specific "hot spots" of the HGD gene. The Slovak clustering probably arose in a small area in the northwest of the country and spread after the 1950s due to migration.

== History ==
Alkaptonuria was one of the four diseases described by Archibald Edward Garrod, as being the result of the accumulation of intermediates due to metabolic deficiencies. He linked ochronosis with the accumulation of alkaptans in 1902, and his views on the subject, including its mode of heritance, were summarized in a 1908 Croonian Lecture at the Royal College of Physicians. The genetics of it was also studied by William Bateson in 1902.

The defect was narrowed down to homogentisic acid oxidase deficiency in a study published in 1958. The genetic basis was elucidated in 1996, when HGD mutations were demonstrated.A 1977 study showed that an ochronotic Egyptian mummy had probably suffered from alkaptonuria.

== Society and culture ==
The AKU Society is a charity which support all people affected by AKU. Based in the UK, the charity can be contacted here. It has a number of international AKU sister societies who provide support across the world.The AKU Society works to provide information, education, support, and helps people to access treatment for their condition. A number of support resources are available here and they have also been translated into all major languages here

As part of the DevelopAKUre consortium, the AKU Society successfully proved the effectiveness of nitisinone to treat AKU, leading to the drug receiving approval from the European Medicines Agency in 2020. The AKU Society continues to drive research into developing potential treatments and cures for AKU working closely with a number of universities across the world.

== Research directions ==
Research collaborations by several national centres have been established to find a more definitive treatment for alkaptonuria. This has included studies on the use of nitisinone and investigations into antioxidants to inhibit ochronosis. The ideal treatment would replace HGD enzyme function without accumulating other substances.

== See also ==
- List of cutaneous conditions
- List of radiographic findings associated with cutaneous conditions
