= Homogentisate 1,2-dioxygenase =

Enzyme

HGD

Identifiers
- Aliases: HGD, AKU, HGO, homogentisate 1,2-dioxygenase
- External IDs: OMIM: 607474; MGI: 96078; GeneCards: HGD
Available structures
PDB	Ortholog search: PDBe RCSB
PDB	List of PDB id codes 1EYB, 1EY2
Enzyme activity
EC #	BRENDA	ExPASy	KEGG	MetaCyc
1.13.11.5	↗	↗	↗	↗

Gene location (Human)
Chr.	Chromosome 3 (human)
Band	3q13.33	Start	120,628,172 bp
Band	3q13.33	End	120,682,269 bp

Gene location (Mouse)
Chr.	Chromosome 16 (mouse)
Band	16 B3|16 26.4 cM	Start	37,400,515 bp
Band	16 B3|16 26.4 cM	End	37,452,382 bp
RNA expression pattern
Bgee	Human / Mouse (ortholog); Top expressed in: right lobe of liver; gallbladder; right lobe of thyroid gland; kidney tubule; left lobe of thyroid gland; body of pancreas; islet of Langerhans; human kidney; mucosa of transverse colon; rectum / Top expressed in: left lobe of liver; right kidney; human kidney; proximal tubule; vestibular membrane of cochlear duct; right lobe of liver; yolk sac; hair; gallbladder; sexually immature organism; More reference expression data
BioGPS	n/a
Gene ontology
Molecular function	oxidoreductase activity; protein binding; dioxygenase activity; metal ion binding; homogentisate 1,2-dioxygenase activity; identical protein binding
Cellular component	cytosol; extracellular exosome
Biological process	tyrosine metabolic process; cellular amino acid metabolic process; L-phenylalanine catabolic process; tyrosine catabolic process
Sources:Amigo / QuickGO
Orthologs
Databases	NCBI: entry; OMA: entry
Species	Human	Mouse
Entrez	3081	15233
Ensembl	ENSG00000113924	ENSMUSG00000022821
UniProt	Q93099	O09173
RefSeq (mRNA)	NM_000187	NM_013547
RefSeq (protein)	NP_000178	NP_038575
Location (UCSC)	Chr 3: 120.63 – 120.68 Mb	Chr 16: 37.4 – 37.45 Mb
PubMed search
- Wikidata
View/Edit Human	View/Edit Mouse

homogentisate 1,2-dioxygenase
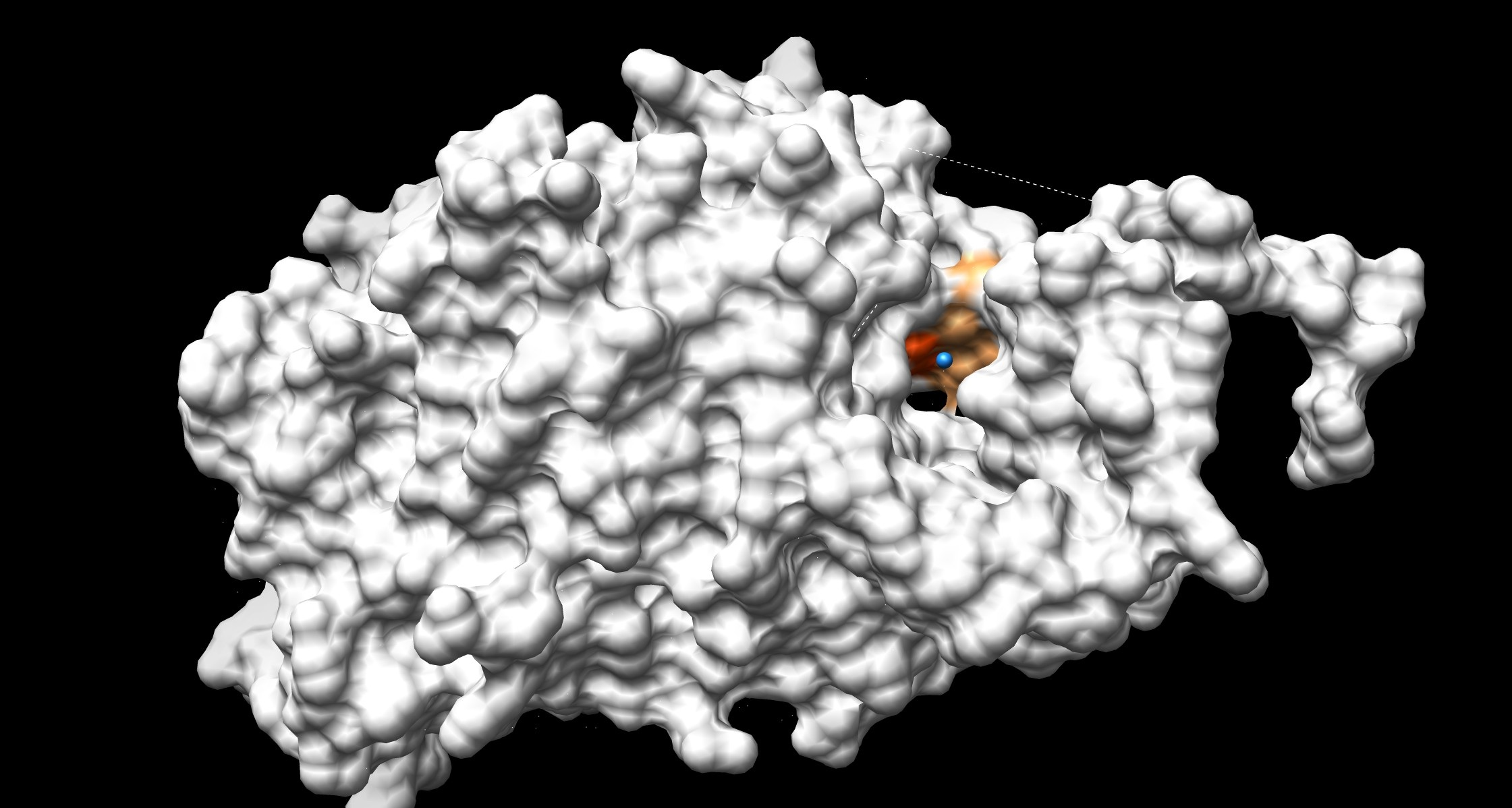
- 3D rendering of Homogentisate Dioxygenase with active site amino acid residues and Iron atom colored. Histidine is the tan color, Glutamate the red color, and Iron is the blue.

Identifiers
- EC no.: 1.13.11.5
- CAS no.: 9029-49-6

Databases
- BRENDA: enzyme data
- ExPASy: NiceZyme view
- KEGG: enzyme entry
- MetaCyc: metabolic pathway
- Rhea: reactions
- PDB structures: RCSB PDB PDBe PDBsum
- Gene Ontology: AmiGO / QuickGO
Search
- PMC: articles
- PubMed: articles
- NCBI: proteins

Homogentisate 1,2-dioxygenase (homogentisic acid oxidase, homogentisate oxidase, homogentisicase) is an enzyme which catalyzes the conversion of homogentisic acid to 4-maleylacetoacetic acid. Homogentisate 1,2-dioxygenase or HGD is involved in the catabolism of aromatic rings, more specifically in the breakdown of the amino acids tyrosine and phenylalanine. HGD appears in the metabolic pathway of tyrosine and phenylalanine degradation once the molecule homogentisate is produced. Homogentisate reacts with HGD to produce maleylacetoacetate, which then is further used in the metabolic pathway. HGD requires the use of Fe^{2+} and O_{2} in order to cleave the aromatic ring of homogentisate.

Homogentisic acid
O_{2}
4-Maleylacetoacetic acid

== Enzyme active site ==
The active site of Homogentisate 1,2-dioxygenase was determined through the crystal structure, which was captured through the work of Titus et al. Through the crystal structure the active site was found to contain the following residues; His292, His335, His365, His371, and Glu341.

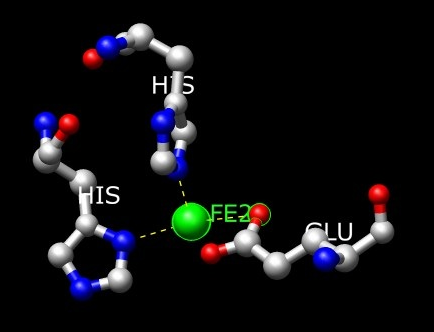
Active Site of HGD containing His335, His371, Glu341, and the Fe^{2+} atom

Homogentisate binds in the active site to Glu341, His335, and His371 via the Fe^{2+} atom. The His292 binds to the hydroxyl group of the aromatic ring. His365 binds to Glu341 via hydrogen bonding to stabilize the amino acid side chains.

== Pathology ==
Homegentisate 1,2 dioxygenase is involved in a type of metabolic diseases, called alkaptonuria. This disorder is due to the inability of the body to deal with homogentisate, which when oxidized by the body will produce the compound known as the ochronotic pigment, which causes a black color, and has several negative effects. This first of these effects is that the patient’s earwax will begin to turn black or red, depends on the patient’s diet, since the blood becomes oxidized and thus turns black due to excess of the ochronotic pigment. The other effect of the ochronotic pigment is that it can accumulate in the body’s connective tissue leading to degenerative arthritis, as the person grows older. Alkaptonuria has another effect in that it can cause the urine to turn black as well if let to sit for long enough to become oxidized, though is this often a method for testing for the genetic defect. The metabolic disease is autosomal recessive, such that both parents must pass the gene on to their children in order for child to have the defect.

== Mechanism ==
Borowski et al. propose a mechanism for HGD in their article featured in the Journal of the American Chemical Society. They base their mechanism on results from hybrid DFT calculations with B3LYP functionals using the programs Gaussian03 and Jaguar. The opening of the aromatic ring in homogentisate is a multi-step process. In the first two steps Fe^{2+} coordinates to the carbonyl and ortho phenol oxygens. The iron atom is also coordinated to His335, His371, and Glu341. O_{2} then binds to the iron atom, subsequently reacting with the aromatic ring to form a peroxo-bridged intermediate.

In the next step, O_{2} is cleaved with the formation of an epoxide. This epoxide intermediate allowing radical reactions to eventually open and oxidize the six-membered ring.

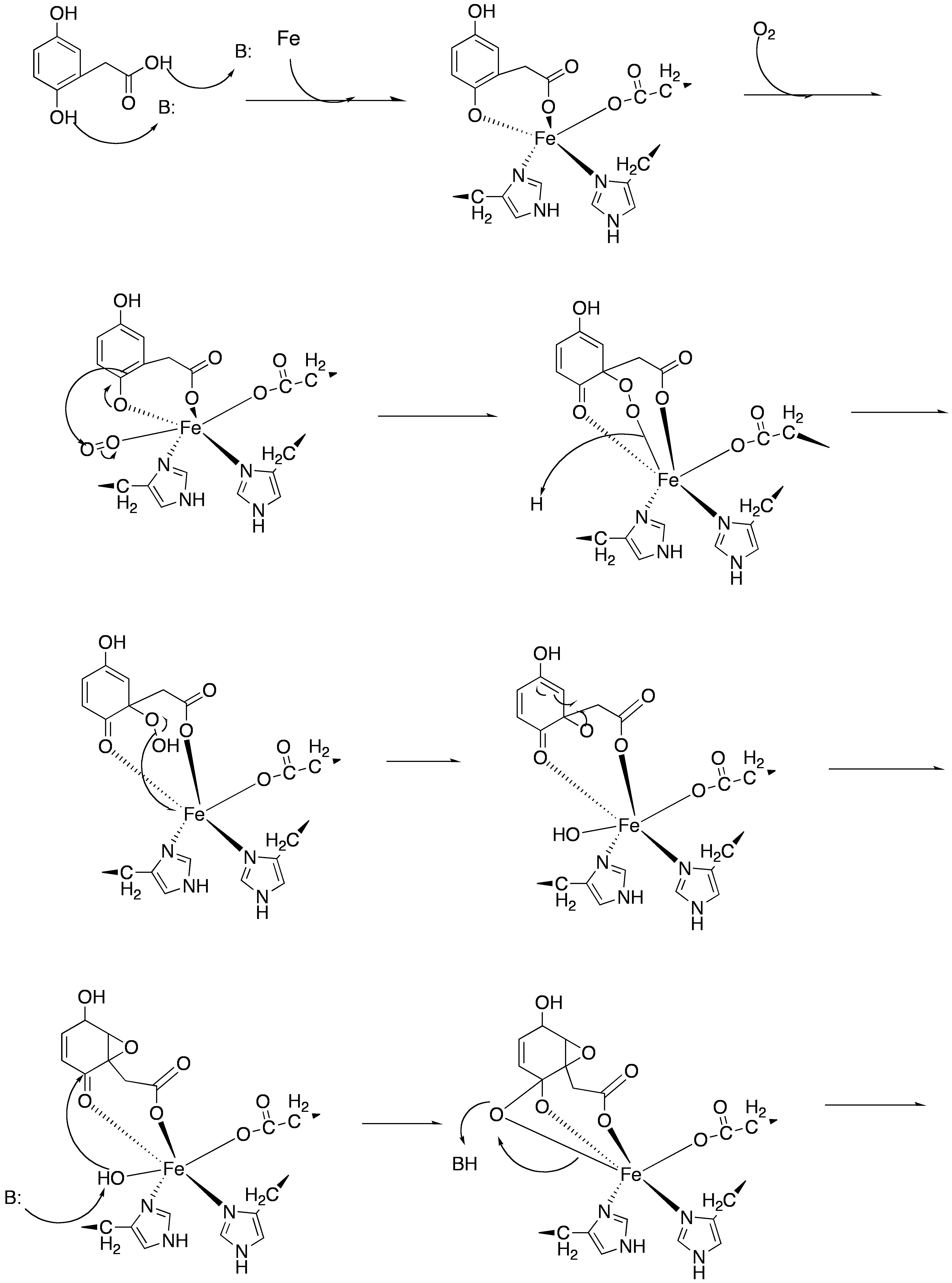
Steps 1-8 of the mechanism

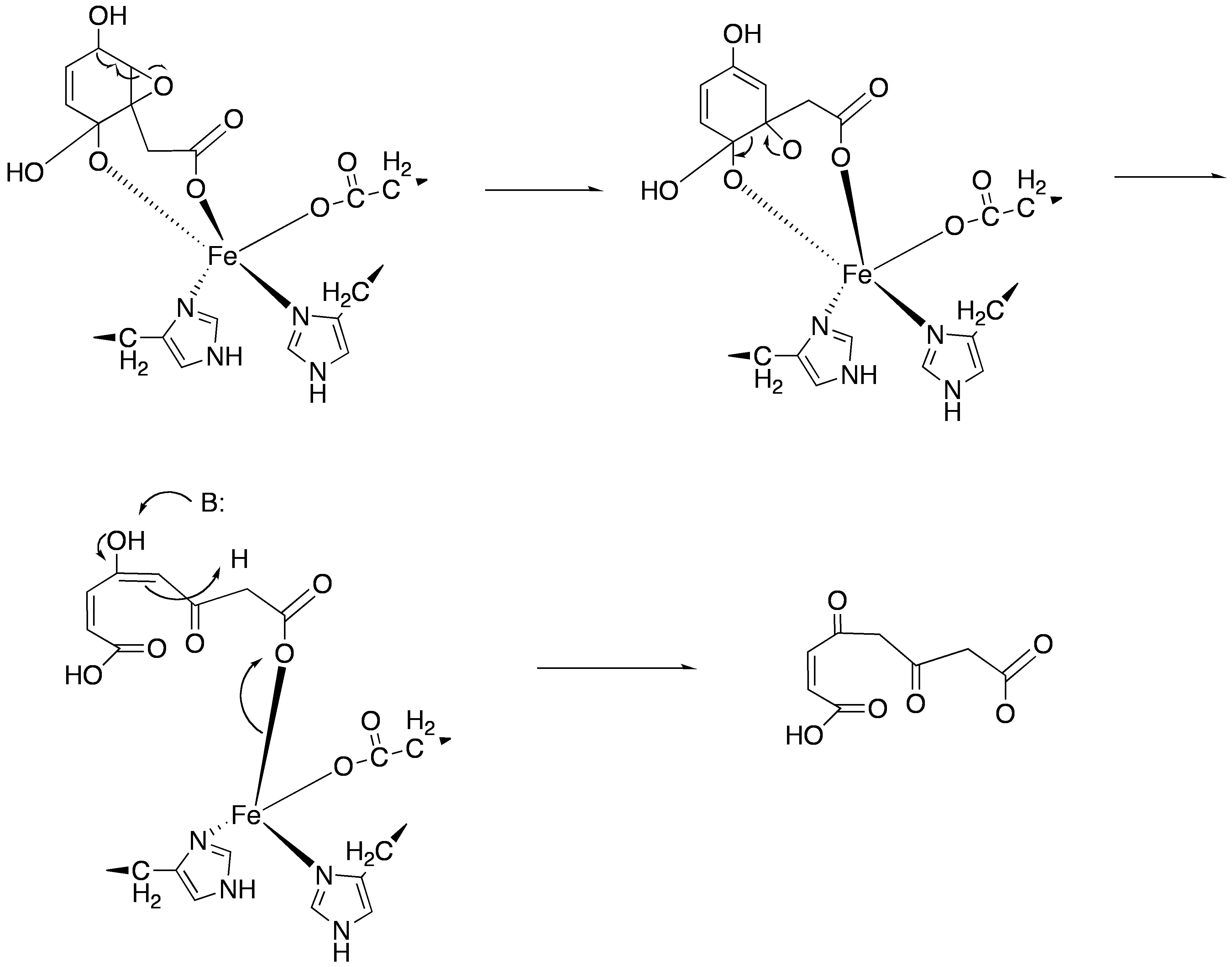
Steps 9-11 of the mechanism
