= Homogentisic acid =

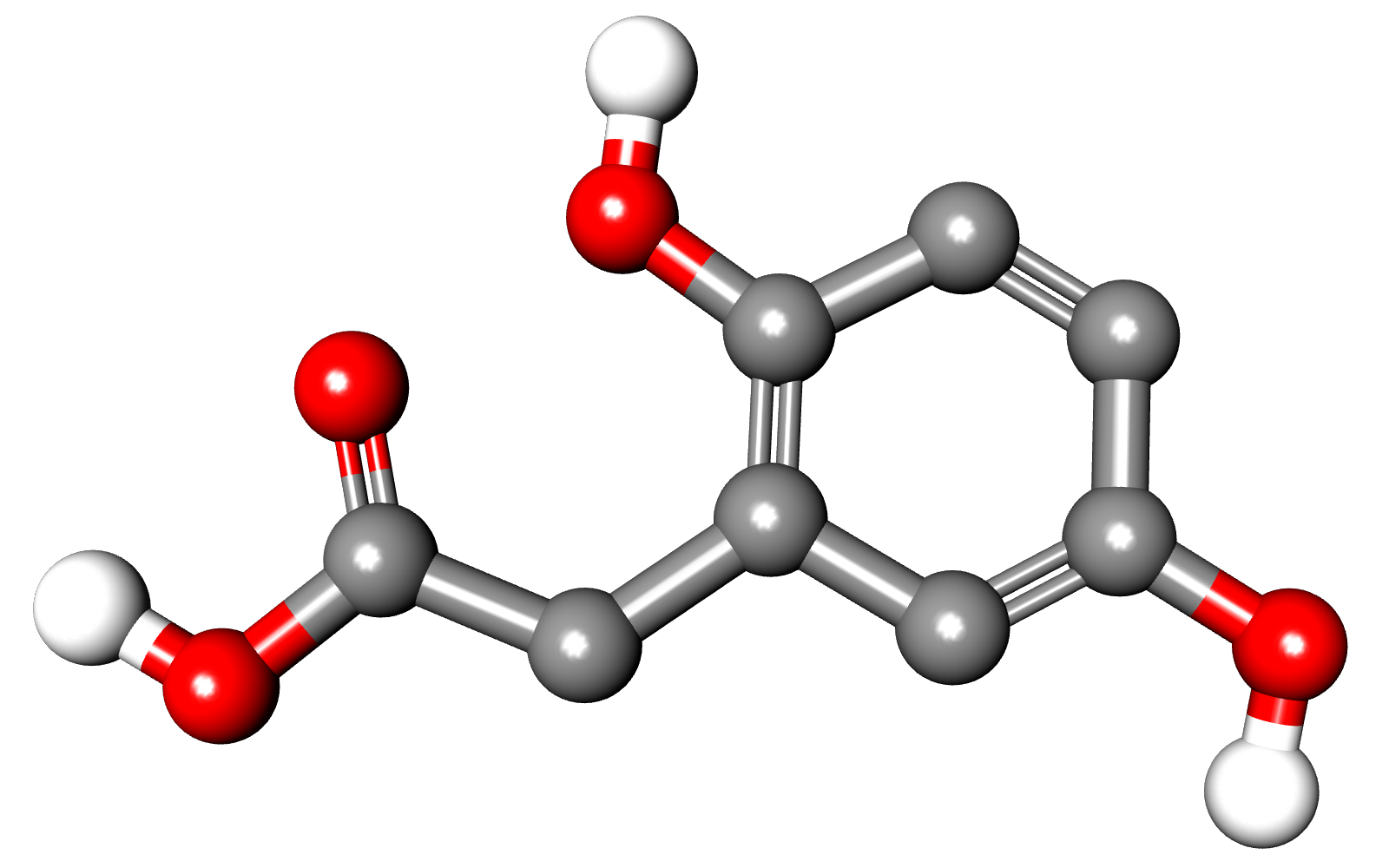

Names
- Preferred IUPAC name (2,5-Dihydroxyphenyl)acetic acid
- Other names Melanic acid

Identifiers
CAS Number	451-13-8
3D model (JSmol)	Interactive image
ChEBI	CHEBI:44747
ChemSpider	759
DrugBank	DB08327
ECHA InfoCard	100.006.540
KEGG	C00544
MeSH	Homogentisic+acid
PubChem CID	780
UNII	NP8UE6VF08
CompTox Dashboard (EPA)	DTXSID1060005
- InChI: InChI=1S/C8H8O4/c9-6-1-2-7(10)5(3-6)4-8(11)12/h1-3,9-10H,4H2,(H,11,12) Key: IGMNYECMUMZDDF-UHFFFAOYSA-N; InChI=1/C8H8O4/c9-6-1-2-7(10)5(3-6)4-8(11)12/h1-3,9-10H,4H2,(H,11,12) Key: IGMNYECMUMZDDF-UHFFFAOYAK
- SMILES: O=C(O)Cc1cc(O)ccc1O

Properties
Chemical formula	C_{8}H_{8}O_{4}
Molar mass	168.148 g·mol^{−1}
Melting point	150 to 152 °C (302 to 306 °F; 423 to 425 K)
- Except where otherwise noted, data are given for materials in their standard state (at 25 °C [77 °F], 100 kPa). verify (what is ?) Infobox references

Homogentisic acid (2,5-dihydroxyphenylacetic acid) is a phenolic acid usually found in Arbutus unedo (strawberry-tree) honey. It is also present in the bacterial plant pathogen Xanthomonas campestris pv. phaseoli as well as in the yeast Yarrowia lipolytica where it is associated with the production of brown pigments. It is oxidatively dimerised to form hipposudoric acid, one of the main constituents of the 'blood sweat' of hippopotamuses.

It is less commonly known as melanic acid, the name chosen by William Prout.

== Human pathology ==
Accumulation of excess homogentisic acid and its oxide, named alkapton, is a result of the failure of the enzyme homogentisic acid 1,2-dioxygenase (typically due to a mutation) in the degradative pathway of tyrosine, consequently associated with alkaptonuria.

== Intermediate ==
It is an intermediate in the catabolism of aromatic amino acids such as phenylalanine and tyrosine.

4-Hydroxyphenylpyruvate (produced by transamination of tyrosine) is acted upon by the enzyme 4-hydroxyphenylpyruvate dioxygenase to yield homogentisate. If active and present, the enzyme homogentisate 1,2-dioxygenase further degrades homogentisic acid to yield 4-maleylacetoacetic acid.
