= 4-Maleylacetoacetic acid =

Names
- Preferred IUPAC name (2Z)-4,6-Dioxooct-2-enedioic acid
- Other names 4-Maleylacetoacetate

Identifiers
CAS Number	5698-52-2
3D model (JSmol)	Interactive image
ChEBI	CHEBI:47904
ChEMBL	ChEMBL1743220
ChemSpider	4444078
KEGG	C01036
PubChem CID	5280393
UNII	5ET93TW8TE
CompTox Dashboard (EPA)	DTXSID201299688
- InChI: InChI=1S/C8H8O6/c9-5(1-2-7(11)12)3-6(10)4-8(13)14/h1-2H,3-4H2,(H,11,12)(H,13,14)/b2-1- Key: GACSIVHAIFQKTC-UPHRSURJSA-N
- SMILES: O=C(/C=C\C(=O)O)CC(=O)CC(=O)O

Properties
Chemical formula	C_{8}H_{8}O_{6}
Molar mass	200.146 g·mol^{−1}
- Except where otherwise noted, data are given for materials in their standard state (at 25 °C [77 °F], 100 kPa). Infobox references

4-Maleylacetoacetate (4-maleylacetoacetatic acid) is an intermediate in the metabolism of tyrosine. It is converted to fumarylacetoacetic acid by the enzyme 4-maleylacetoacetate cis-trans-isomerase.

== Biosynthesis ==
The amino acid tyrosine is metabolised in a series of reactions, one of which is catalysed by homogentisate 1,2-dioxygenase. This converts the intermediate homogentisic acid into 4-maleylacetoacetic acid.

Homogentisic acid
O_{2}
4-Maleylacetoacetic acid

== Metabolism ==
The enzyme maleylacetoacetate isomerase converts 4-maleylacetoacetic acid to its geometric isomer, fumarylacetoacetic acid.

4-Maleylacetoacetic acid
Fumarylacetoacetic acid
