= Isoxaflutole =

Isoxaflutol

Names
- IUPAC name (5-cyclopropyl-1,2-oxazol-4-yl)-[2-methylsulfonyl-4-(trifluoromethyl)phenyl]methanone
- Other names: RPA201772

Identifiers
CAS Number	141112-29-0
3D model (JSmol)	Interactive image
Beilstein Reference	8344543
ChEBI	CHEBI:141213
ChEMBL	ChEMBL1887147
ChemSpider	75869
DrugBank	DB12938
ECHA InfoCard	100.114.433
EC Number	604-222-4
PubChem CID	84098
UNII	0T9R0O0EYT
CompTox Dashboard (EPA)	DTXSID5034723
- InChI: InChI=1S/C15H12F3NO4S/c1-24(21,22)12-6-9(15(16,17)18)4-5-10(12)13(20)11-7-19-23-14(11)8-2-3-8/h4-8H,2-3H2,1H3 Key: OYIKARCXOQLFHF-UHFFFAOYSA-N
- SMILES: CS(=O)(=O)C1=C(C=CC(=C1)C(F)(F)F)C(=O)C2=C(ON=C2)C3CC3

Properties
Chemical formula	C_{15}H_{12}F_{3}NO_{4}S
Molar mass	359.32 g·mol^{−1}
Appearance	Off-white or pale yellow solid
Density	1.59 g/cm^{3}
Melting point	138 °C (280 °F; 411 K)
Solubility in water	6.2 mg/L
log P	2.32

Hazards
- GHS labelling
Pictograms	(GHS08: Health hazard) (GHS09: Environmental hazard)
Signal word	Warning
Hazard statements	H361d, H410
Precautionary statements	P203, P273, P280, P318, P391, P405, P501
- Except where otherwise noted, data are given for materials in their standard state (at 25 °C [77 °F], 100 kPa). Infobox references

Isoxaflutole is a selective herbicide used mainly in maize crops. It inhibits the enzyme 4-hydroxyphenylpyruvate dioxygenase (HPPD) and is sold under brand names including Balance and Merlin. It was first marketed by Rhône-Poulenc in 1996.

== History ==
In the mid-1980s, scientists at Stauffer Chemical Company published patents to benzoyl-substituted cyclohexanediones (triketones) which led to their product mesotrione. This encouraged workers at Rhône-Poulenc to expand their own research into molecules with the same mode of action as these 4-hydroxyphenylpyruvate dioxygenase inhibitors. In doing so, they found that isoxaflutole had commercial potential as a propesticide of a biologically active diketonitrile that it was converted into within plants. It was developed under the code number RPA201772.

== Synthesis ==
The isoxazole ring of the heterocycle product is formed when hydroxylamine reacts in ethanol with an intermediate which is made from an appropriately substituted diketone with triethyl orthoformate, using acetic anhydride as solvent.

The crystal structure of isoxaflutole has been determined. Within plants, it is converted to the diketonitrile shown, which is herbicidally active as an HPPD inhibitor. The advantage of applying isoxafluole rather than the diketonitrile is that the former is more readily taken up into plants from a soil treatment.

== Usage ==
Isoxaflutole was first marketed by Rhône-Poulenc in 1996. It controls weeds which are important in crops including corn and sugarcane. These include broad-leaved-weeds from Amaranthus, Datura stramonium and ragweed species and annual grass weeds of Alopecurus, Eriochloa and Panicum species.

The herbicide is usually applied to the soil in which the crop is growing, before the emergence of the weeds. In the US it is applied almost exclusively in corn with annual use in 2018 about 600,000 pounds (270,000 kg). The compound is often formulated in combination with the herbicide safener, cyprosulfamide. For example, in the EU the product that was evaluated by regulators was a suspension concentrate containing 240 g/L isoxaflutole and 240 g/L cyprosulfamide.

== Environmental and Human safety ==
The EPA has stated that isoxaflutole demonstrates developmental toxicity; and has classified isoxaflutole as a Group B2 carcinogen (probable human carcinogen) based on liver and thyroid endpoints. Modeling data show that isoxaflutole and its primary metabolite RPA 202248 may accumulate, and that its terminal metabolite RPA 203328 is expected to persist and accumulate.

The LD_{50} of isoxaflutole is over 5000 mg/kg (rats, oral), The European Food Safety Authority set an acceptable daily intake for it at 0.02 mg/kg bodyweight. The Codex Alimentarius database maintained by the FAO lists the maximum residue limits for isoxaflutole in various food products, most of which are set at its 0.01 mg/kg or 0.02 mg/kg limit of detection for the combination of the compound and its diketonitrile.

== Brands ==
Isoxaflutole is the ISO common name for the active ingredient which is formulated into the branded product sold to end-users. The brand names in use for herbicides containing isoxaflutole include Balance, Cadu Star, Merlin and Spade.
