= 4-Hydroxyphenylpyruvate dioxygenase inhibitor =

Class of herbicides

4-Hydroxyphenylpyruvate dioxygenase (HPPD) inhibitors (HPPD inhibitors) are a class of herbicides that prevent growth in plants by blocking 4-Hydroxyphenylpyruvate dioxygenase, an enzyme in plants that breaks down the amino acid tyrosine into molecules that are then used by plants to create other molecules that plants need. This process of breakdown (catabolism) and the production of new molecules from the results (biosynthesis), is something that all living things do. HPPD inhibitors were first brought to market in 1980, although their mechanism of action was not understood until the late 1990s. At the time, they were primarily used in the Japanese rice production industry, but since the late 1990s have been used in Europe and North America for corn, soybeans, and cereals. Since the 2000s, they have become more important as weeds have become more resistant to glyphosate and other herbicides. Genetically modified crops which are resistant to HPPD inhibitors are under development. There is a pharmaceutical drug on the market, nitisinone, that was originally under development as an herbicide as a member of this class and is used to treat an orphan disease, type I tyrosinemia.

HPPD inhibitors can be classified into three fundamental chemical frameworks: pyrazolones, triketones, and diketonitriles. The triketone class is based on a chemical that certain plants make in self-defense called leptospermone; the class was developed by scientists at companies that eventually became part of Syngenta. Bayer CropScience has also been active in developing new HPPD inhibitors.

== Mechanism of action ==
The mechanism of action for HPPD inhibitors was misunderstood for the first twenty years that these products were sold, starting in 1980. They were originally thought to be inhibitors of protoporphyrinogen oxidase (protox).

4-Hydroxyphenylpyruvate dioxygenase (HPPD) is an enzyme found in both plants and animals, which catalyzes the catabolism of the amino acid tyrosine. Preventing the breakdown of tyrosine has three negative consequences: the excess of tyrosine stunts growth; the plant suffers oxidative damage due to lack of tocopherols (vitamin E); and chlorophyll is destroyed due to lack of carotenoids that protect it. Plants turn white without deformation due to a complete loss of chlorophyll, which has led compounds of this class to be classified as "bleaching herbicides", as are protox inhibitors.

More specifically, inhibition of HPPD prevents the formation of a breakdown product, homogentisic acid, which in turn is a key precursor for the biosynthesis of both tocopherols and plastoquinone. Plastoquinone is, in turn, a critical co-factor in the formation of carotenoids, which protect chlorophyll in plants from being destroyed by sunlight.

This class of herbicides represents one of the last discoveries of a new herbicide mode of action in the wave of discovery that ended in late 1990s.

== Resistance in weeds ==
As of 2011 very little resistance was known: In 2010 Waterhemp (Amaranthus tuberculatus) in two different locations - Iowa and Illinois - developed resistance.

== Products and economics ==
As of 2009, HPPD inhibitors had three fundamental chemical frameworks:

- pyrazolones: pyrazolate (Sanbird, introduced by Sankyo, 1980); pyrazoxyfen (Paicer, introduced by Ishihara, 1985); benzofenap (Yukawide, introduced by Mitsubishi Chemical Corp and Rhône-Poulenc Agro, 1987, as of 2009 sold by Bayer CropScience as Taipan); pyrasulfotole (Huskie and Infinity, introduced by Bayer CropScience, 2007); and topramezone (Clio and Impact, introduced by BASF, 2006)
- triketones: sulcotrione (Mikado, introduced by Zeneca, 1990 and as of 2009 sold by Bayer CropScience)); mesotrione (Callisto and Lumax, introduced by Zeneca, 2002 and as of 2009 sold by Syngenta); benzobicyclon (ShowAce, introduced by SDS Biotech and Sandoz Crop Protection (now Syngenta), 2001); tembotrione (Laudis introduced by Bayer CropScience, 2007)
- diketonitriles: isoxaflutole (aka IFT) (Balance and Merlin, introduced by Rhône-Poulenc Agro, 1996 and as of 2009 sold by Bayer CropScience)

== Agricultural use ==
Pyrazolate, pyrazoxyfen and benzofenap were first commercialized in the Japanese rice market starting in 1980, but became less important when sulfonylurea herbicides were introduced. In 1990 sulcotrione was introduced for post- emergence weed control in corn. Isoxaflutole opened the market more broadly for HPPD inhibitors when it was introduced in 1996 for corn and sugarcane, and for use as a pre-emergence herbicide that could control broadleaf weeds as did sulcotrione, but also additional grass weeds. Benzobicyclon, was introduced in 2001 for control of broadleaf weeds and some sedges that are problems in rice, that had become resistant to sulfonylurea herbicides. Mesotrione was introduced in 2002 and like sulcotrione is a triketone, so it is effective on the same weeds and crops, but is more potent, making it more useful in mixes with other herbicides - an important factor for fully controlling weeds and preventing the development of resistance. It has become the biggest selling member of the HPPD class.

Topramezone was introduced in 2006 for corn and soy, and is the most potent HPPD inhibitor, but has serious carry-over issues especially for soybean in US, where the minimum time from application to planting is 18 months. Tembotrione was introduced in 2007 for corn, and works against key grass species and importantly, kills broadleaf weeds, including glyphosate-, ALS- and dicamba-resistant weeds. Used with safeners there are no crop-rotation restrictions. Pyrasulfotole was also introduced in 2007 for cereals in North America, and was the first new class of herbicide in cereals in many years, and an important advance against weeds that had become resistant to existing herbicides. It remains active in the soil during the growing season and when used with safeners, it does not damage crops and there are no crop-rotation restrictions.

== Herbicide risks and toxicities ==
Tembotrione has low acute toxicity via the oral, dermal and inhalation routes of exposure (Toxicity category III or IV). It is a dermal sensitizer but not an eye or dermal irritant

== Genetically modified crops ==
To deal with rising resistance to existing herbicides, Bayer CropScience has been developing various genetically modified crops resistant to HPPD inhibitors: in one version, the crops are resistant to both HPPD inhibitors and glyphosate, and in collaboration with Syngenta, crops that are resistant to HPPD inhibitors and glufosinate.

The collaboration to develop the stacked HPPD inhibitor/glyphosate resistant products was first announced in 2007.

== Medical use ==
In Type I tyrosinemia, a different enzyme involved in the breakdown of tyrosine, fumarylacetoacetate hydrolase is mutated and does not work, leading to very harmful products building up in the body. Fumarylacetoacetate hydrolase acts on tyrosine after HPPD does, so scientists working on making these inhibitors hypothesized that inhibiting HPPD and controlling tyrosine in the diet could treat this disease. A series of small clinical trials were attempted with one of their compounds, nitisinone and were successful, leading to nitisinone being brought to market as an orphan drug.

== Vector Control Use ==
In addition to their use as herbicides and clinical treatments, certain HPPD inhibitors have shown potential for use in public health vector control, particularly against Anopheles mosquitoes. Nitisinone, a β-triketone originally approved for treating hereditary tyrosinemia type I in humans, has been demonstrated to kill mosquitoes through both systemic and contact exposure. When administered as an endectocide (i.e., via the bloodmeal), nitisinone disrupts tyrosine metabolism in blood-fed mosquitoes, leading to lethal toxic accumulation.

Nitisinone has also been shown to act as a contact insecticide, causing mortality after mosquitoes (Anopheles gambiae, Aedes aegypti and Culex quinquefasciatus) land on treated surfaces. In contrast, other HPPD inhibitors used in agriculture, such as mesotrione, sulcotrione, and tembotrione, do not appear to induce mosquito mortality through tarsal contact, limiting their potential for direct application in surface-based interventions.

== History of the discovery of the triketone class of HPPD inhibitors ==
The origin of the triketone family of HPPD inhibitors had its beginnings in the curiosity of a biologist about allelopathic weed control of weeds in the back yard of his house. This curiosity led to the discovery and development of the triketone class of herbicides. Investigation of the mode of action of this class of compounds led to the discovery that it could be used to treat patients with tyrosinaemia type 1, a treatment which has been said to "transform the natural history of tyrosinaemia".

All of the herbicidal and pharmaceutical triketone HPPD inhibitors including mesotrione (Callisto)(I), sulcotrione (Mikado)(II) and nitisinone (Orfadin)(III) had their common origin in the observation in 1977 by Reed Gray, a biologist at Stauffer Chemical's Western Research Center (WRC) in California, that few weeds emerged under bottlebrush plants (Callistemon citrinus) in the back yard of his house.

I

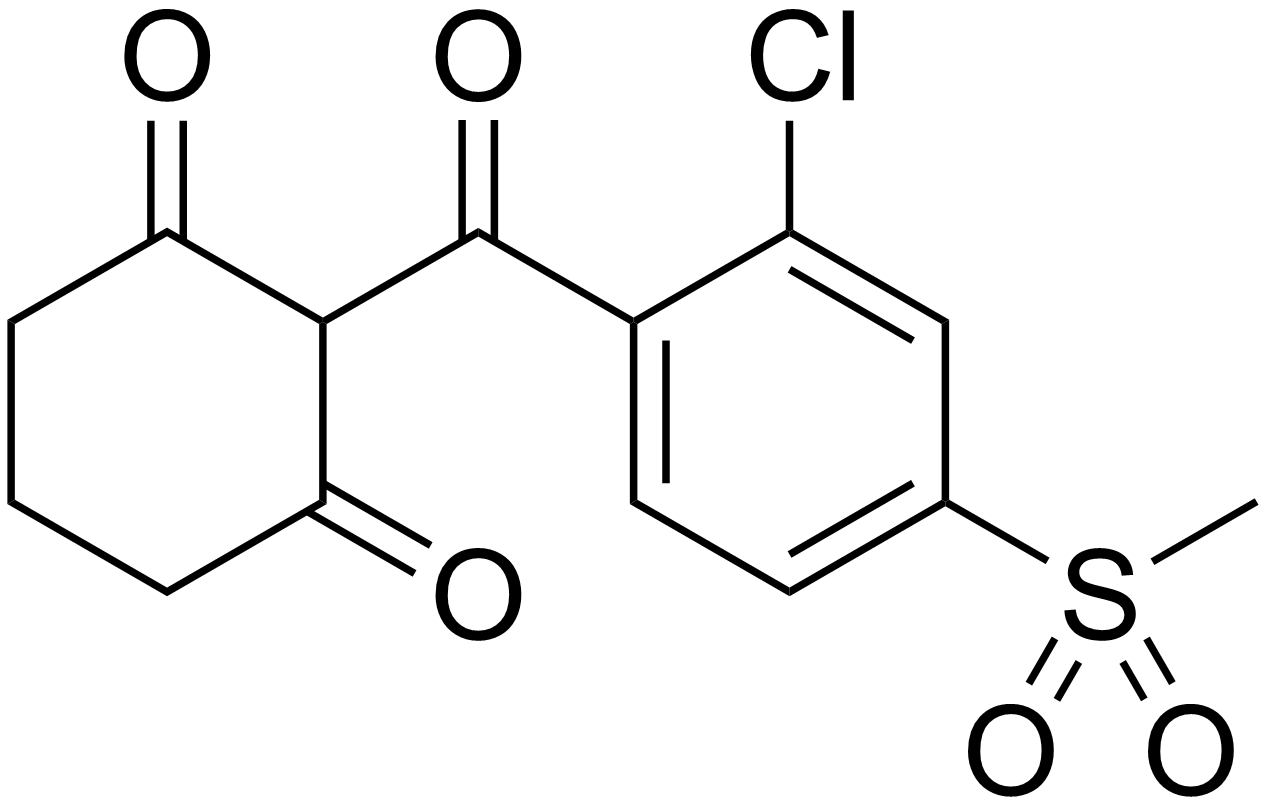
II

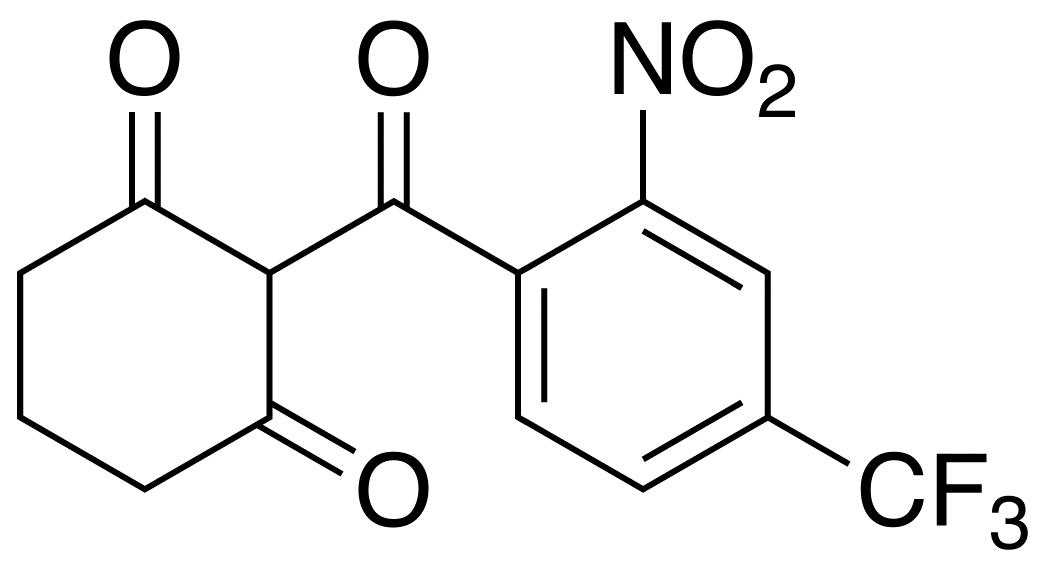
III

To investigate this effect, he took soil from underneath these plants and extracted and fractionated it. The resulting extracts were applied to soil flats containing watergrass (Echinochloa crus-galli) as an indicator species at the very high application rate of 100 pounds per acre (112 kg/ha). There was a herbicidal effect from this test, so the extracts were developed on a preparative thin layer chromatographic sheet. The same Echinochloa crus-galli seeds were placed on this sheet and germinated. The active ingredient was identified by bleaching symptoms on the test species.

The area where the herbicidal activity was seen was extracted and he submitted the isolated active ingredient to Ken Cheng at the Western Research Center who, using proton NMR, IR and mass spectrometry identified the structure as being that of Leptospermone (IV) which was a known natural product that had been derived from the steam-volatile oils of some Australian plants, but which had never been cited as having any biological activity.

IV

He approached a chemist, Ron Rusay, at the Western Research Center who independently synthesized the compound and submitted it for further greenhouse testing. These tests showed that it had modest herbicidal activity against grass weeds at a very high application rate of 100 pounds per acre (112 kg/ha). He prepared a series of analogs in which the alkanoyl group was modified and a patent was obtained on this series of compounds. These compounds had similar, weak herbicidal activity similar to that found with the lead compound. Because of the weak herbicidal activity, work on other analogs was not pursued.

Shortly after this, another WRC chemist, Bill Michaely, synthesized an aroyl triketone (V) as an unexpected byproduct when attempting to synthesize a sethoxydim (VI) analog.

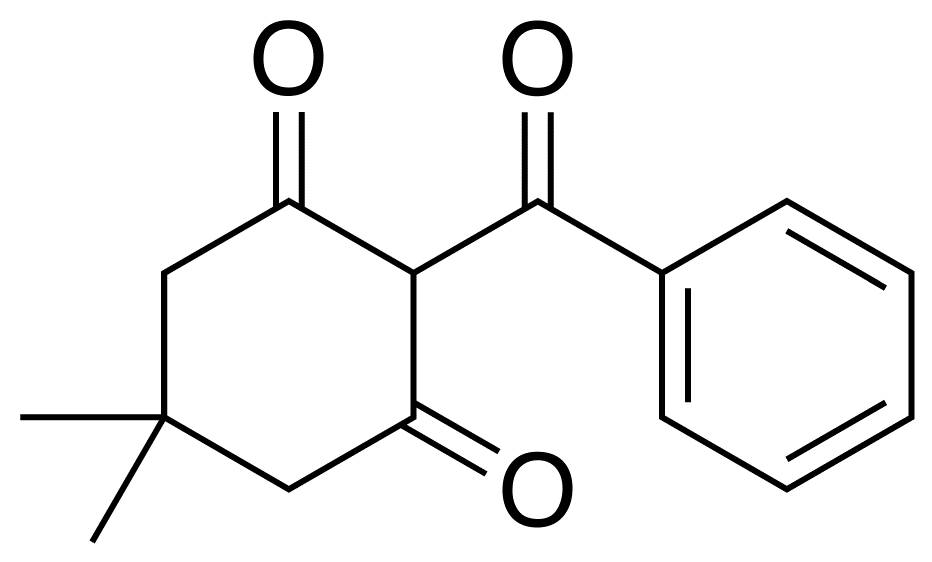
V

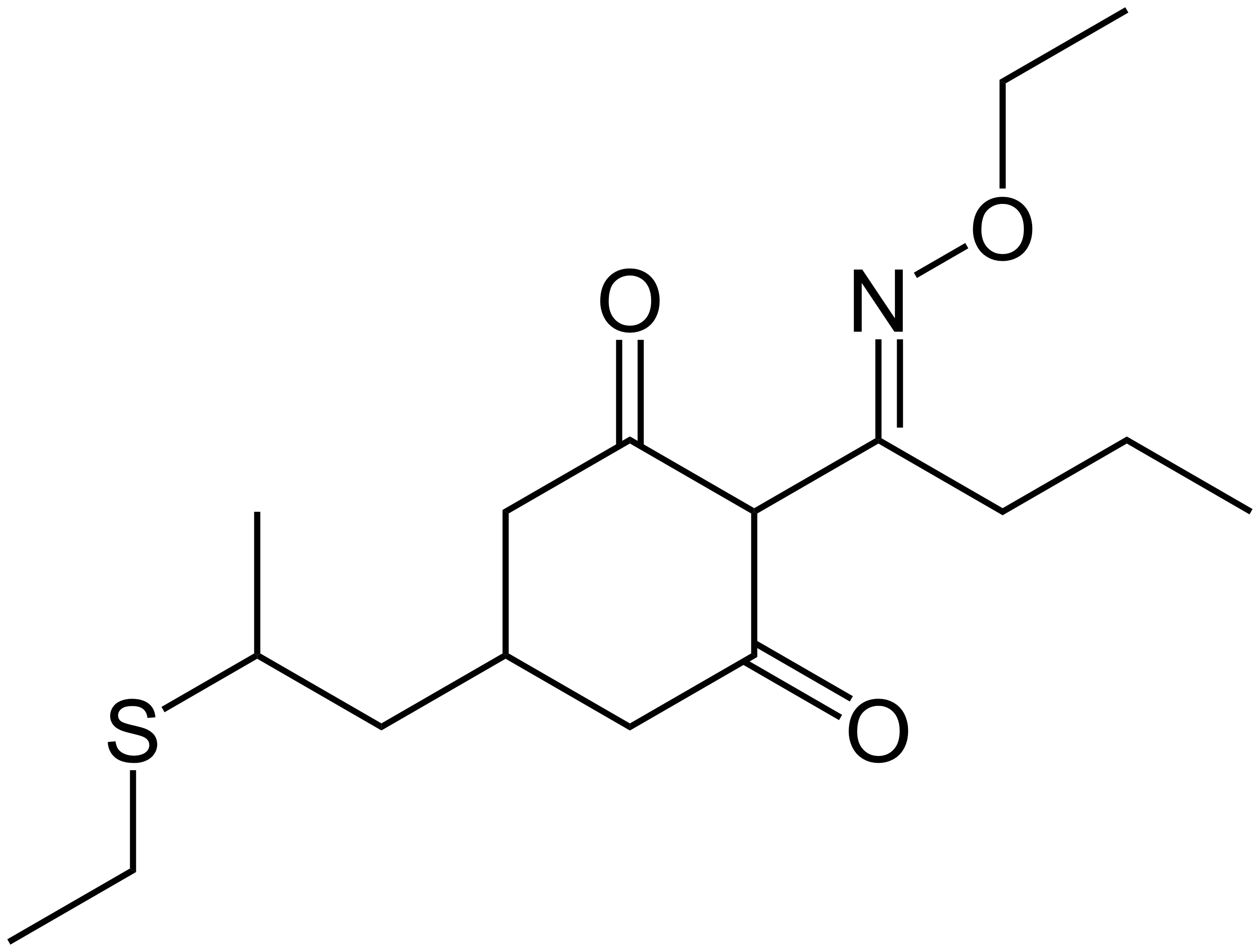
VI

While this compound did not have any herbicidal activity, it did show activity in a screen designed to show antidotal activity toward other herbicides. When attempting to optimize the antidote activity, several aryl substituted analogs were prepared. What was discovered was that those compounds with an ortho substituent had herbicidal activity but no antidote activity. This observation coupled with the knowledge of the herbicidal activity of the earlier leptospermone analogs was pivotal in formulating an idea of a potential toxophore for this class of herbicides.

A small task force consisting of David Lee, Bill Michaely and Don James prepared a number of substituted triketones with chloro-, bromo- and methyl-substituents in the ortho position. Biological activity remained modest and the task force was disbanded after a short while.

One working hypothesis was that the active ingredient in these triketones was the cyclized tetrahydroxanthenones(VII). Bill Michaely prepared several of these, but the herbicidal activity remained modest and all work in the area was terminated. It was not until David Lee was able to show that these compounds were in equilibrium with the 2-hydroxy triketones(VIII) by trapping the intermediate with methyl iodide that the reason for the biological activity was understood.

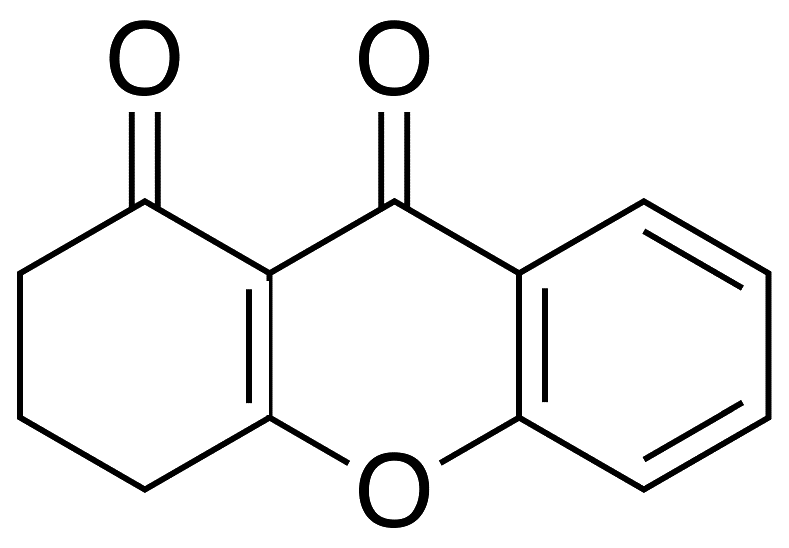
VII

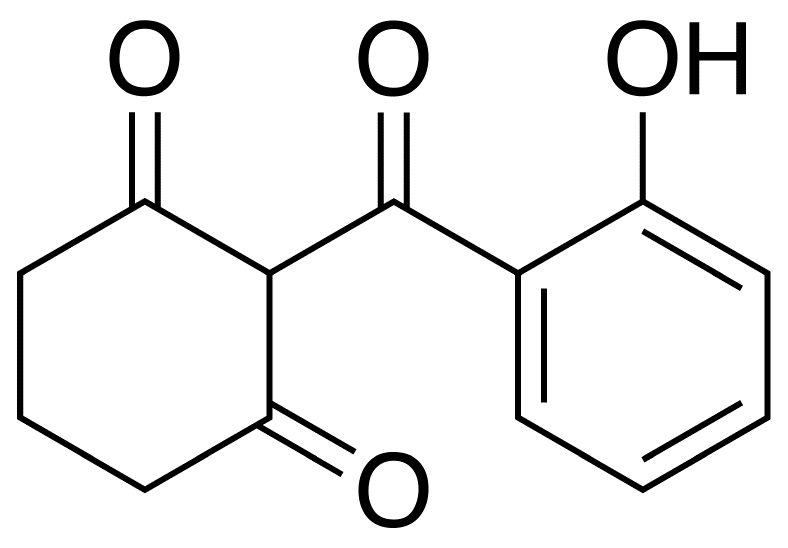
VIII

David Lee had a strong background in quantitative structure–activity relationships (QSAR) after a post-doctoral year with Professors Manfred Wolff and Peter Kollman where he used the Prophet system. Looking over the QSAR (quantitative structure–activity relationships) of the triketones, David Lee saw a potential discrepancy in the existing structure-activity analysis. Other than the 2-chloro-4-nitro substitution pattern, no other triketones with electron-withdrawing substituents in the 4-position had ever been prepared. He hypothesized that the activity of the triketones could be correlated to the electron withdrawing ability of the substituents. The activity of the 2-chloro-4-nitro analog was an outlier, and it was theorized that perhaps the nitro group was being reduced in vivo. The 4-methylsulfonyl group was then prepared to test this hypothesis, and what was to become the commercial herbicide Mikado (II) was prepared. The prospect of improving the biological activity with new aromatic substitution patterns totally rejuvenated work on the triketones.

A key discovery in the preparation of these compounds was the finding by Jim Heather in the WRC Process Development group that acetone cyanohydrin was a good catalyst for the preparation of the o-chloro analogs. Use of this catalyst allowed for the first time production of the o-nitro triketones.

At this point a very large effort on the synthesis of analogs was commenced with David Lee coordinating the effort. Key chemists participating in this were Charles Carter, Bill Michaely, Hsiao-ling Chin, Nhan Nguyen and Chris Knudsen, although at one time almost every synthesis chemist at the WRC worked on this project. Within a relatively short time, major progress was made in optimizing certain substitution combinations. SC-0051 (sulcotrione) was synthesized and tested in Sept. – Oct. 1983, and SC-1296 (mesotrione) and SC-0735 (nitisinone) were both synthesized and tested in early 1984. Triketones were in widespread university field trials in 1985. The first of the triketone patents was published in 1986.

With a long history of working with bleaching herbicides which inhibit phytoene desaturase including the commercial herbicide flurochloridone(IX), there was some considerable interest to find that these compounds do not inhibit phytoene desaturase in vitro. The fact that phytoene desaturase inhibitors typically have a high log P, whereas the triketones do not, further suggested a different mode of action.

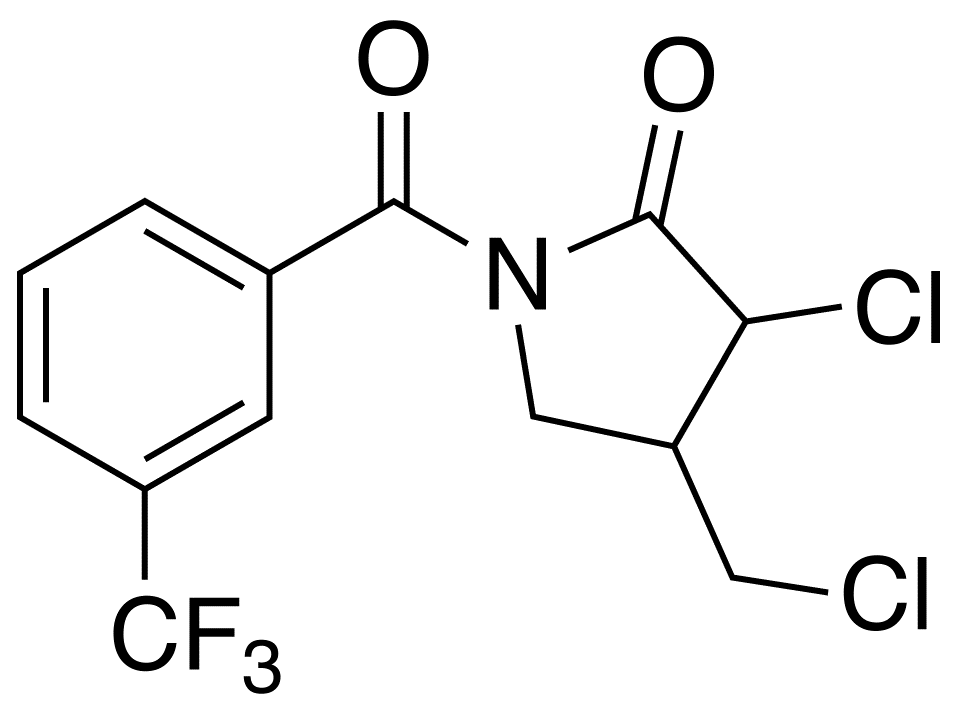
IX

There had been some early toxicological concern about corneal and paw lesions which were observed with rats that had repeatedly dosed with a triketone. Several chemists and toxicologists came upon a paper describing very similar ocular, but not skin, lesions with inhibitors of tyrosine hydroxylase. Linda Mutter in the WRC Toxicology Section used a spot test for tyrosine on the urine of treated rats and had positive results. Plasma tyrosine analysis further confirmed the buildup of tyrosine in treated rats.

Work on the mode of action and toxicology of the triketones took on a broader range of interactions when Stauffer Chemical was purchased by ICI in June 1987. ICI then split off the pharmaceutical and agrochemical businesses as Zeneca and then Syngenta was formed in 2000 by the merger of Novartis Agribusiness and Zeneca Agrochemicals.

As part of toxicology studies, Martin Ellis at the ICI Central Toxicology Laboratory identified triketone inhibition of tyrosine catabolism in rat liver and also found that tyrosine hydroxylase was not inhibited by the triketones. He furthermore found that the urine of rats treated with III showed elevated levels of both p-hydroxyphenylpyruvate and p-hydoxyphenyllactic acids. These results suggested that p-hydroxyphenylpyruvate dioxygenase (HPPD) was the enzyme that was inhibited, a fact which was confirmed by S. Lindstedt. Further tests established that HPPD was the enzyme inhibited in plants as well as mammals.
