= HPPD =

HPPD may refer to:

- Hallucinogen persisting perception disorder, a perception disorder that can be caused by hallucinogenic drug use
- 4-hydroxyphenylpyruvate dioxygenase, an enzyme found in almost all aerobic life forms and the primary target of some herbicides

- One of those HPPD inhibitor herbicides, a 4-hydroxyphenylpyruvate dioxygenase inhibitor

- Hours per patient-day, a staffing goal to determine the number of clinicians needed to provide a certain standard of care to a set of patients
