= Mesotrione =

Chemical compound used as an herbicide

Names
- IUPAC name 2-(4-mesyl-2-nitrobenzoyl)cyclohexane-1,3-dione
- Preferred IUPAC name 2-[4-(Methylsulfonyl)-2-nitrobenzoyl]cyclohexane-1,3-dione
- Other names ZA1296

Identifiers
CAS Number	104206-82-8
3D model (JSmol)	Interactive image
ChEBI	CHEBI:38321
ChemSpider	153301
ECHA InfoCard	100.111.661
PubChem CID	175967
UNII	48TR68G21T
CompTox Dashboard (EPA)	DTXSID7032424
- InChI: InChI=1S/C14H13NO7S/c1-23(21,22)8-5-6-9(10(7-8)15(19)20)14(18)13-11(16)3-2-4-12(13)17/h5-7,13H,2-4H2,1H3 Key: KPUREKXXPHOJQT-UHFFFAOYSA-N
- SMILES: CS(=O)(=O)c1ccc(c(c1)[N+](=O)[O-])C(=O)C2C(=O)CCCC2=O

Properties
Chemical formula	C_{14}H_{13}NO_{7}S
Molar mass	339.32 g·mol^{−1}
Appearance	Yellow to tan coloured solid
Density	1.49 g/cm^{3}
Melting point	165.3 °C (329.5 °F; 438.4 K)
Solubility in water	1500 mg/L (20 °C)
log P	0.11
Acidity (pK_{a})	3.12

Hazards
- GHS labelling
Pictograms	(GHS09: Environmental hazard)
Signal word	Warning
Hazard statements	H410
Precautionary statements	P273, P391, P501
- Except where otherwise noted, data are given for materials in their standard state (at 25 °C [77 °F], 100 kPa). Infobox references

Mesotrione is a selective herbicide used mainly in maize crops and has also been shown to have limited insecticidal properties. It is a synthetic compound inspired by the natural substance leptospermone found in the bottlebrush tree Callistemon citrinus. It inhibits the enzyme 4-hydroxyphenylpyruvate dioxygenase (HPPD) and is sold under brand names including Callisto and Tenacity. It was first marketed by Syngenta in 2001.

== History ==
The invention of the triketone class of herbicides had its beginnings in an observation in 1977 of allelopathic weed control near a bottlebrush tree, Callistemon citrinus. Chemists at the Stauffer Chemical Company identified the compound responsible as leptospermone, a known natural product which had not previously been reported as having biological activity. Extensive work on analogues led to the discovery and development of sulcotrione and mesotrione.^{[25][26}}^{[12]}

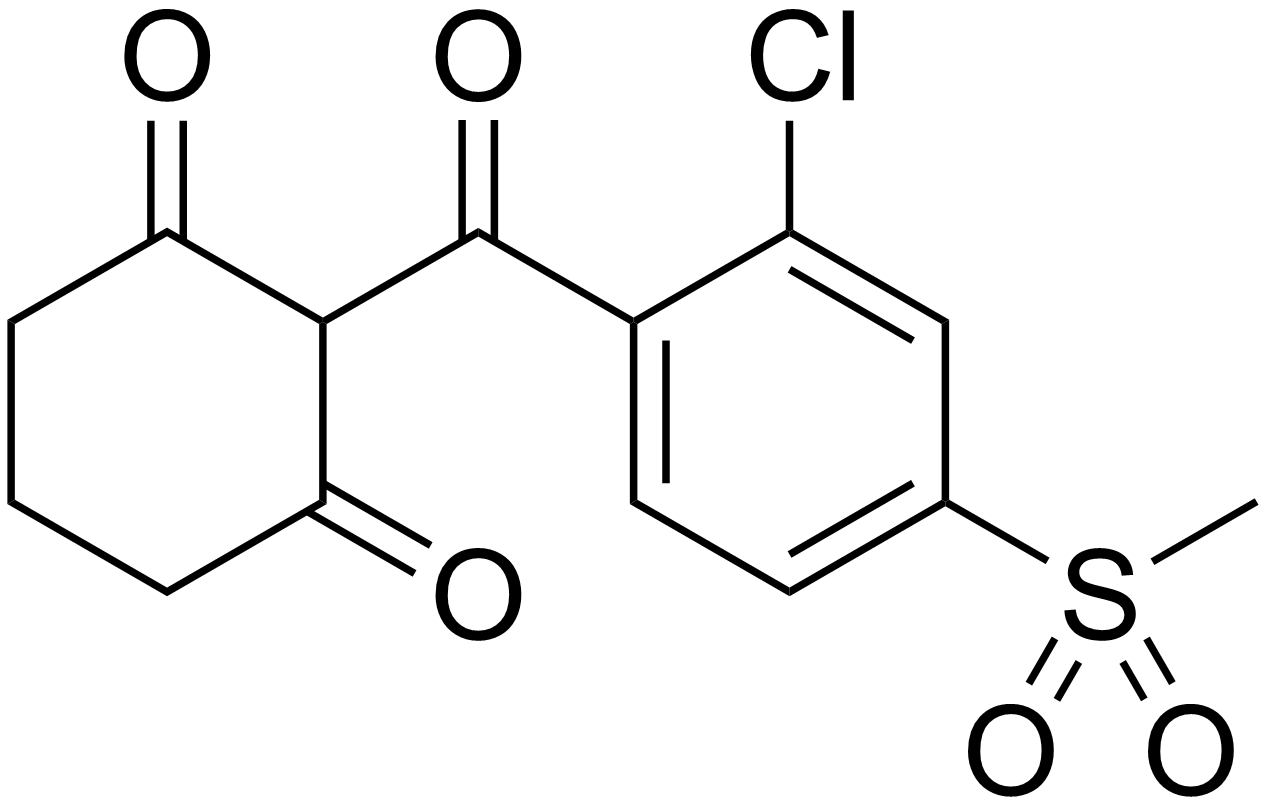
Chemical structures of leptospermone (left), sulcotrione (middle), and mesotrione (right)

The triketone herbicides were found to be effective on a wide range of commercially-important weed species and to have both pre- and post-emergence activity. Mesotrione was chosen for development (by Zeneca Agrochemicals under the code number ZA1296) because it controls a wide range of broad-leaved weeds that compete with maize and can also suppress some annual grass weeds that may be present in the crop. It achieves this selectivity and lack of damage to the crop owing to its greater potency on the target enzyme found in dicotyledons than monocotyledons and because maize can metabolise the compound in the dione-containing ring.

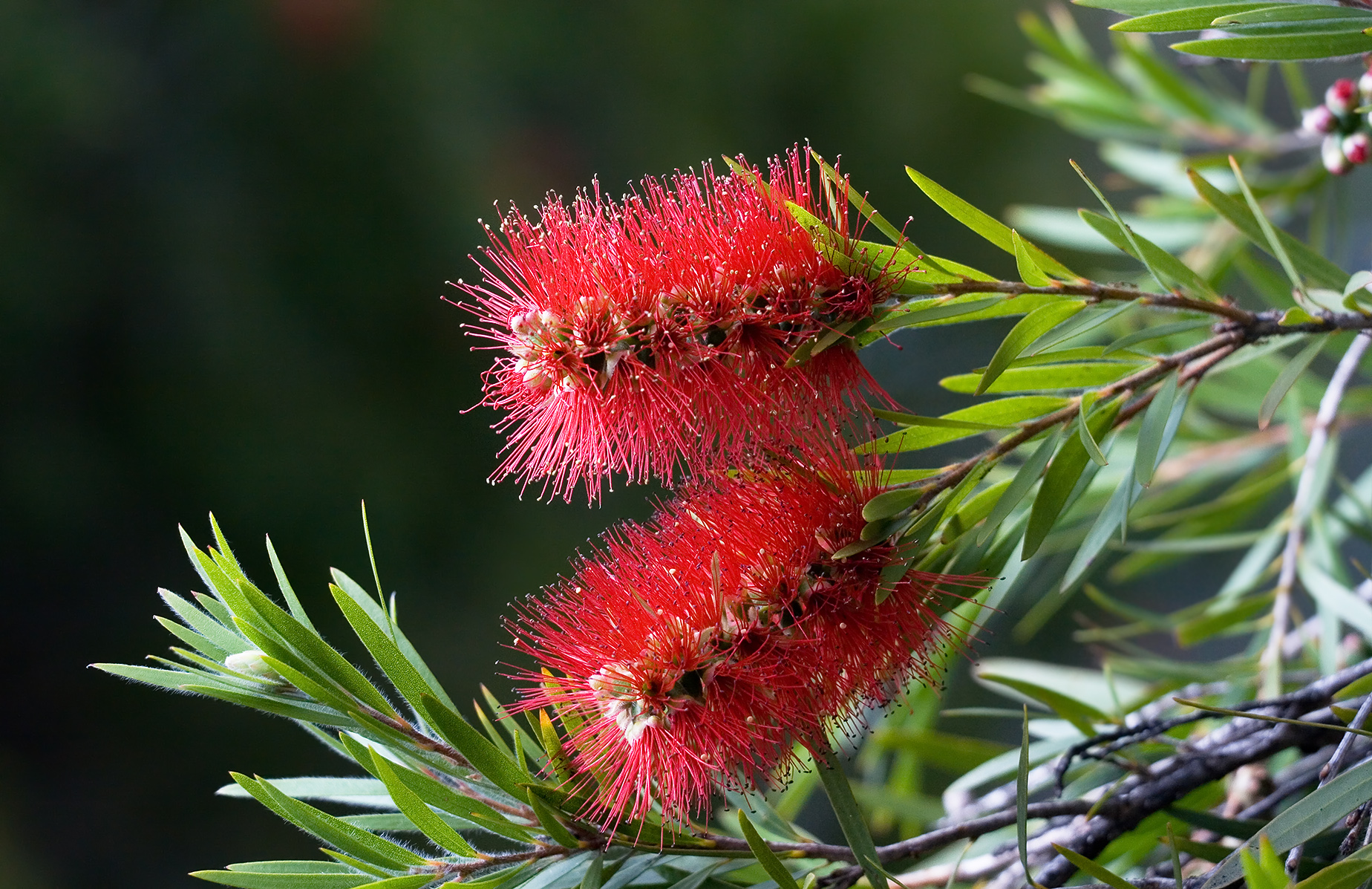
Callistemon citrinus, the bottlebrush tree

== Synthesis ==
The synthesis of mesotrione was first disclosed in patents filed by ICI, who had acquired Stauffer in 1987. 1,3-Cyclohexanedione is first reacted with the acid chloride of 4-(methylsulfonyl)-2-nitrobenzoic acid under conditions in which the enolic hydroxyl group of the diketone reacts to form the benzoylated derivative. In a separate step, this is rearranged to mesotrione using a catalytic amount of cyanide ion derived from acetone cyanohydrin.

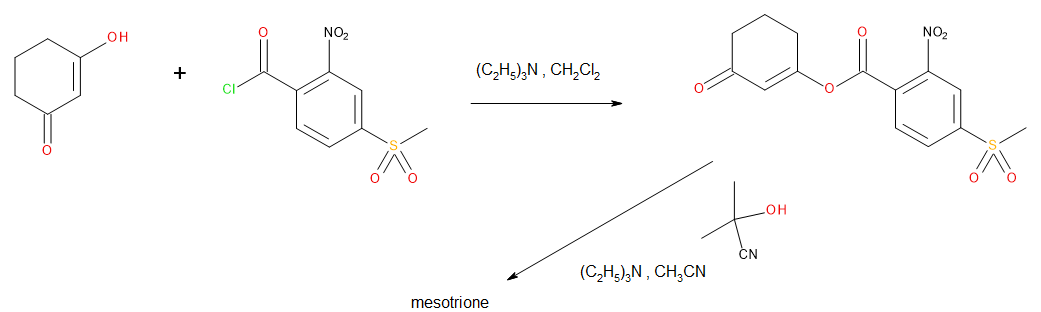

== Mechanism of action ==
Mesotrione inhibits the enzyme 4-hydroxyphenylpyruvate dioxygenase (HPPD). It is an extremely potent inhibitor of HPPD in laboratory tests using the plant Arabidopsis thaliana, with a K_{i} value of about 10 pM. In plants, HPPD is necessary for the biosynthesis of tocopherols and of plastoquinone, which is essential to carotenoid production. Inhibition of the pathway ultimately leads to bleaching of leaves as chlorophyll is degraded, followed by plant death.

== Formulations ==
Mesotrione is made available to end-users only in formulated products. These use non-powdery material with reduced or no use of hazardous solvents, for example suspension concentrates. The herbicide is compatible with other compounds that may be mixed by the farmer to extend control to the grass weeds which mesotrione itself does not kill.

== Usage ==
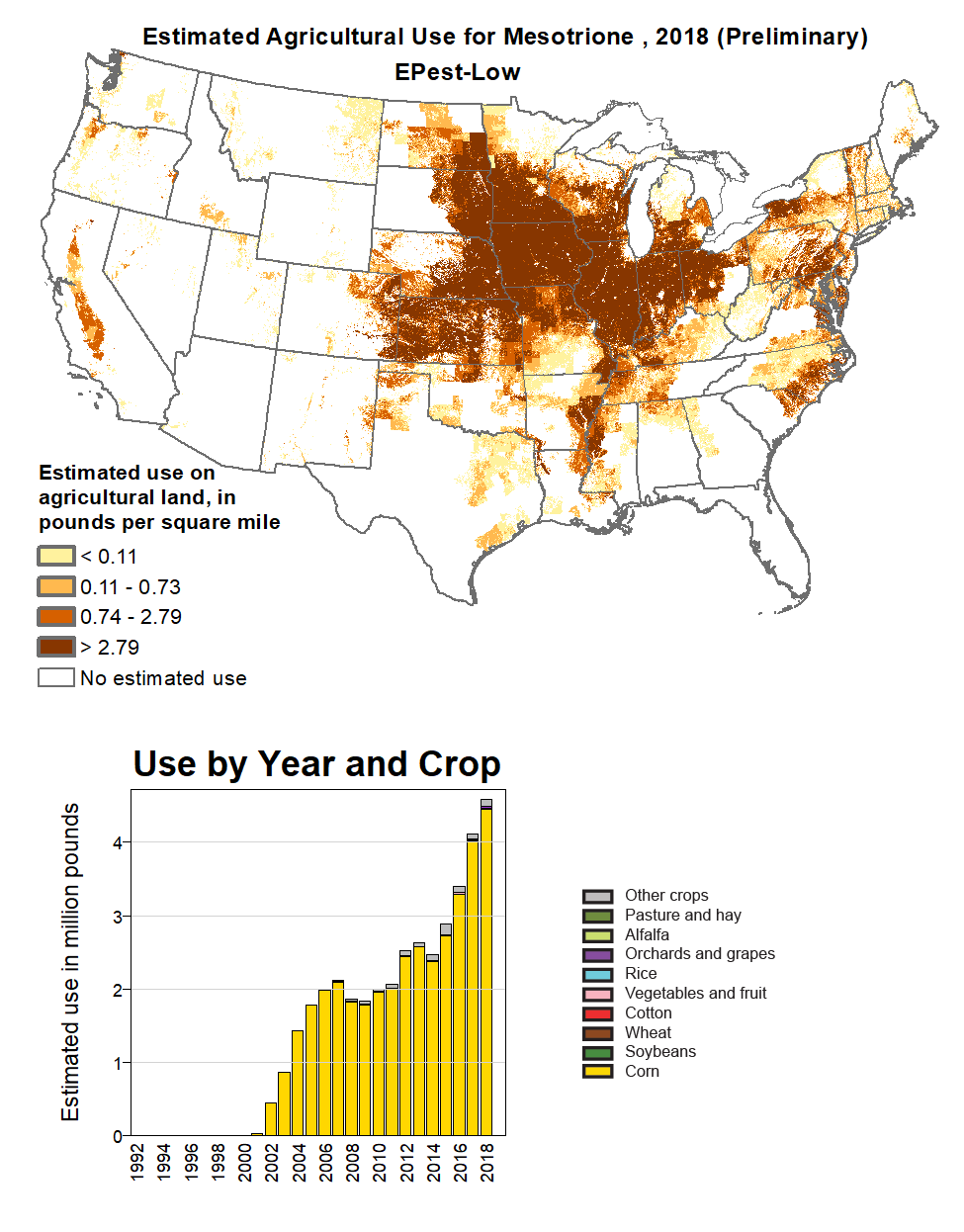
US Geological Survey estimate of mesotrione use in the USA to 2018

Mesotrione is a systemic pre- and post-emergence herbicide for the selective contact and residual control of broadleaf weeds in field corn, seed corn, yellow popcorn and sweet corn. Mesotrione possesses a broad spectrum of activity on commercially important broadleaf weeds including Abutilon theophrasti, Amaranthus powellii, Amaranthus retroflexus, Chenopodium album, Datura stramonium, Digitaria sanguinalis, Lamium purpureum, Polygonum persicaria, Rumex crispus, Senecio vulgaris, Solanum nigrum, Stellaria media and Xanthium strumarium. In addition, its properties mean that it can be applied to soil so emerging weeds take it up and are controlled. Alternatively, spraying after weeds are already present in the crop will also lead to control. This combination of properties has meant that mesotrione achieved widespread use very quickly and reached annual sales of more than $400 million by 2011. The product is used at application rates of 75-150 g/ha.

The estimated annual use of mesotrione in US agriculture is mapped by the US Geological Service and shows an increasing trend from its introduction in 2001 to 2018, the latest date for which figures are available and now reaching 4,500,000 pounds (2,000,000 kg). As would be expected for a compound used almost exclusively in maize, the heaviest use is in the Corn Belt.

== Human safety ==
The LD_{50} of mesotrione is over 5000 mg/kg (rats, oral), which means that it is practically non-toxic by oral ingestion, but it can cause serious eye irritation. First aid information is included with the label. The World Health Organization (WHO) and Food and Agriculture Organization (FAO) joint meeting on pesticide residues has determined that the acceptable daily intake for mesotrione is 0-0.5 mg/kg bodyweight. The Codex Alimentarius database maintained by the FAO lists the maximum residue limits for mesotrione in various food products, most of which are set at its 0.01 mg/kg limit of detection.

== Effects on the environment ==
Mesotrione is very toxic to aquatic life with long-lasting effects. It is toxic to hematophagous (blood-consuming) arthropods such as mosquitoes and ticks, but also toxic to some beneficial arthropods such as spiders, predatory mites, and parasitic wasps. Its ecotoxicology is summarised in the Pesticide Properties database.

== Resistance management ==
Reports of individual weed species, for example Amaranthus tuberculatus, becoming resistant to mesotrione are monitored by manufacturers, regulatory bodies such as the EPA and the Herbicides Resistance Action Committee (HRAC). In some cases, the risks of resistance developing can be reduced by using a mixture of two or more herbicides which each have activity on relevant weeds but with unrelated mechanisms of action. HRAC assigns active ingredients into classes so as to facilitate this.

== Brands ==
By international convention and in many countries the law, pesticide labels are required to include the common name of the active ingredients. These names are not the exclusive property of the holder of any patent or trademark and as such they are the easiest way for non-experts to refer to individual chemicals. Companies selling pesticides normally do so using a brand name or wordmark which allows them to distinguish their product from competitor products having the same active ingredient. In many cases, this branding is country and formulation-specific so there can be multiple brand names for a given active ingredient. Mesotrione may be pre-mixed with other herbicides to provide more complete weed control. For example, Acuron is the name used by Syngenta for a mixture containing bicyclopyrone, atrazine and S-metolachlor in addition to mesotrione. Brand names for mesotrione include Callisto, Instigate, Meristo, Resicore and Tenacity. Suppliers and brand names in the United States are listed in the National Pesticide Information Retrieval System.

== See also ==
- Nitisinone (orfadin)
