= Leptospermone =

Names
- IUPAC name 2,2,4,4-Tetramethyl-6-(3-methylbutanoyl)cyclohexane-1,3,5-trione
- Other names Isovaleroylsyncarpic acid; 6-Isovaleroyl-2,2,4,4-tetramethyl-1,3,5-cyclohexanetrione

Identifiers
CAS Number	567-75-9
3D model (JSmol)	Interactive image
ChemSpider	2340805
PubChem CID	3083632
UNII	2F8XBE046L
CompTox Dashboard (EPA)	DTXSID80205258
- InChI: InChI=1S/C15H22O4/c1-8(2)7-9(16)10-11(17)14(3,4)13(19)15(5,6)12(10)18/h8,10H,7H2,1-6H3 Key: YDWYMAHAWHBPPT-UHFFFAOYSA-N; InChI=1/C15H22O4/c1-8(2)7-9(16)10-11(17)14(3,4)13(19)15(5,6)12(10)18/h8,10H,7H2,1-6H3 Key: YDWYMAHAWHBPPT-UHFFFAOYAO
- SMILES: O=C1C(C(=O)C(C(=O)C1(C)C)C(=O)CC(C)C)(C)C

Properties
Chemical formula	C_{15}H_{22}O_{4}
Molar mass	266.337 g·mol^{−1}
- Except where otherwise noted, data are given for materials in their standard state (at 25 °C [77 °F], 100 kPa). verify (what is ?) Infobox references

Leptospermone is a chemical compound (a β-triketone) produced by some members of the myrtle family (Myrtaceae), such as Callistemon citrinus (Lemon Bottlebrush), a shrub native to Australia, and Leptospermum scoparium (Manuka), a New Zealand tree from which it gets its name. Modification of this allelopathic chemical to produce mesotrione led to the commercialization of derivative compounds as HPPD inhibitor herbicides.

== History ==
Leptospermone was first identified in 1927 and was extracted from a variety of plants in 1965, 1966 and 1968. It was first identified as a chemical in Callistemon citrinus in California in 1977. A biologist at the Western Research Centre of Stauffer Chemical Company noticed that very few plants grew under Callistemon citrinus bushes. After taking soil samples and creating an array of extracts, one was identified as an herbicide. While it did have herbicidal effects, the rate required for sufficient coverage was too high to be of practical use.

Leptospermone was optimized into thousands of compounds. Several were extremely effective but were too toxic, environmentally persistent or not selective enough. There are now several members of the triketone class of HPPD inhibitor herbicides on the market.

== Synthesis ==
Leptospermone can be synthesized from phloroglucinol by a reaction with 3-methylbutanenitrile (isovaleronitrile) in the presence of a zinc chloride catalyst. Phloroisovalerone imine is produced which is then alkylated with iodomethane after initial treatment with sodium ethoxide and methanol to produce an intermediate which is treated with aqueous hydrochloric acid resulting in isovaleroylsyncarpic acid (leptospermone).

Biochemically, the plants take a different approach. Despite the fact that the biochemical synthesis has not been specifically investigated, it is clear that leptospermone is not an oxidized terpene (or specifically a sesquiterpene, ei. C_{15}) as the cyclisation of farnesyl pyrophosphate cannot produce two dimethylate carbons that are separated by a single carbon nor would this be consistent with the natural occurrence of similar compounds with different keto-aryl side-chains in the members of the Myrtaceae (eg. flavesone, papuanone, isoleptospermone and grandiflorone). Phloroglucinol is biosynthesized in a single step from malonyl-CoA and could be the intermediate, but other routes of biosynthesis may be possible, such as via isobutyryl-CoA, the result of the decarboxylative condensation of ketoisovalerate (ketone form of valine) (cf. polyketides).

== Uses ==
Leptospermone was the blueprint for the compound mesotrione which has the trade name Callisto, a Syngenta herbicide.
