= Tyrosinemia type III =

- Other names: TYRSN3
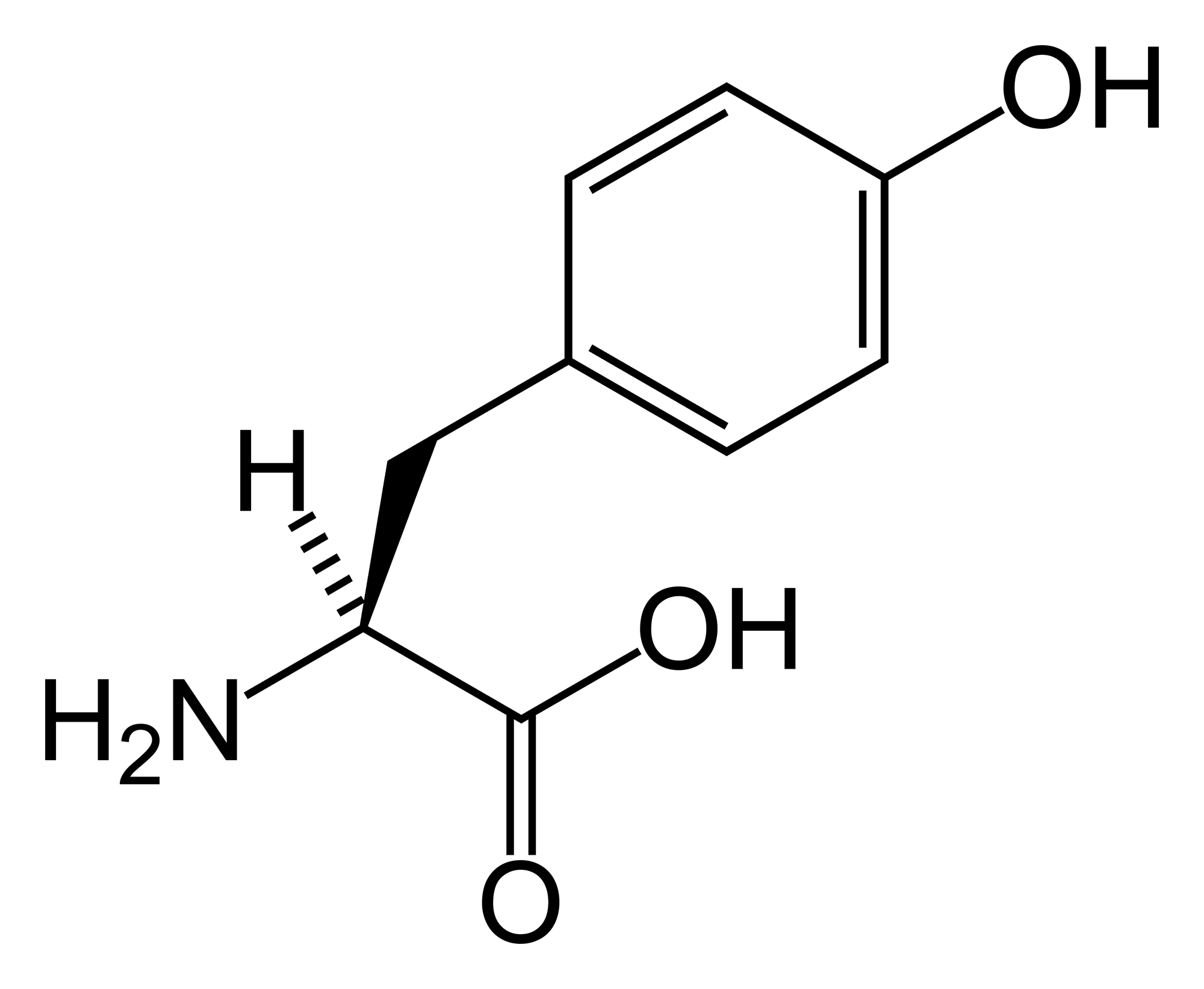
- Tyrosine
- Specialty: Endocrinology

Tyrosinemia type III is a rare disorder caused by a deficiency of the enzyme 4-hydroxyphenylpyruvate dioxygenase (EC 1.13.11.27), encoded by the gene HPD. This enzyme is abundant in the liver, and smaller amounts are found in the kidneys. It is one of a series of enzymes needed to break down tyrosine. Specifically, 4-hydroxyphenylpyruvate dioxygenase converts a tyrosine byproduct called 4-hydroxyphenylpyruvate to homogentisic acid. Characteristic features of type III tyrosinemia include mild mental retardation, seizures, and periodic loss of balance and coordination (intermittent ataxia). Type III tyrosinemia is very rare; only a few cases have been reported.

Pathophysiology of metabolic disorders of tyrosine, resulting in elevated levels of tyrosine in blood.
