= Herbicide =

Type of chemical used to kill unwanted plants

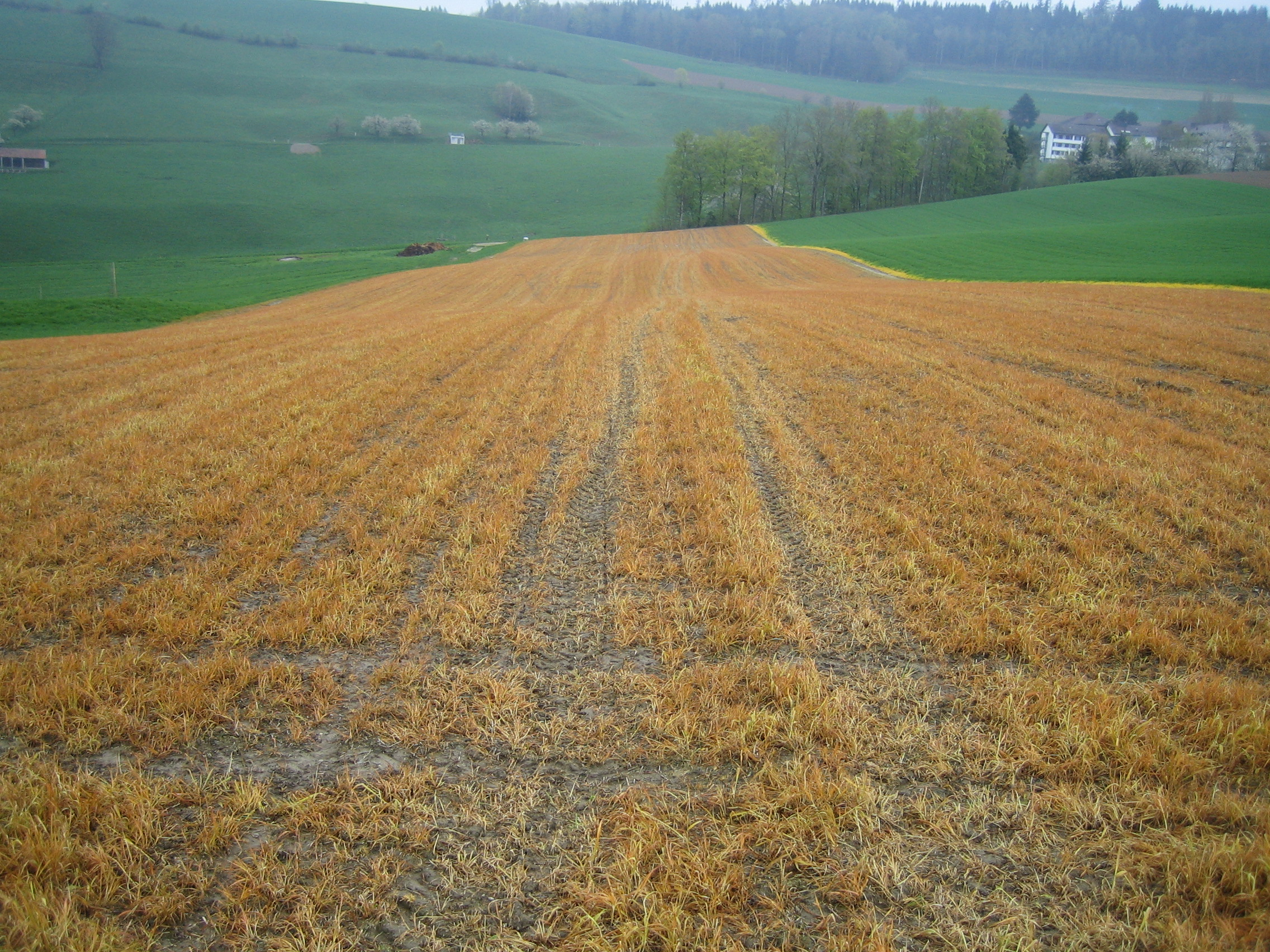
A field after application of a herbicide

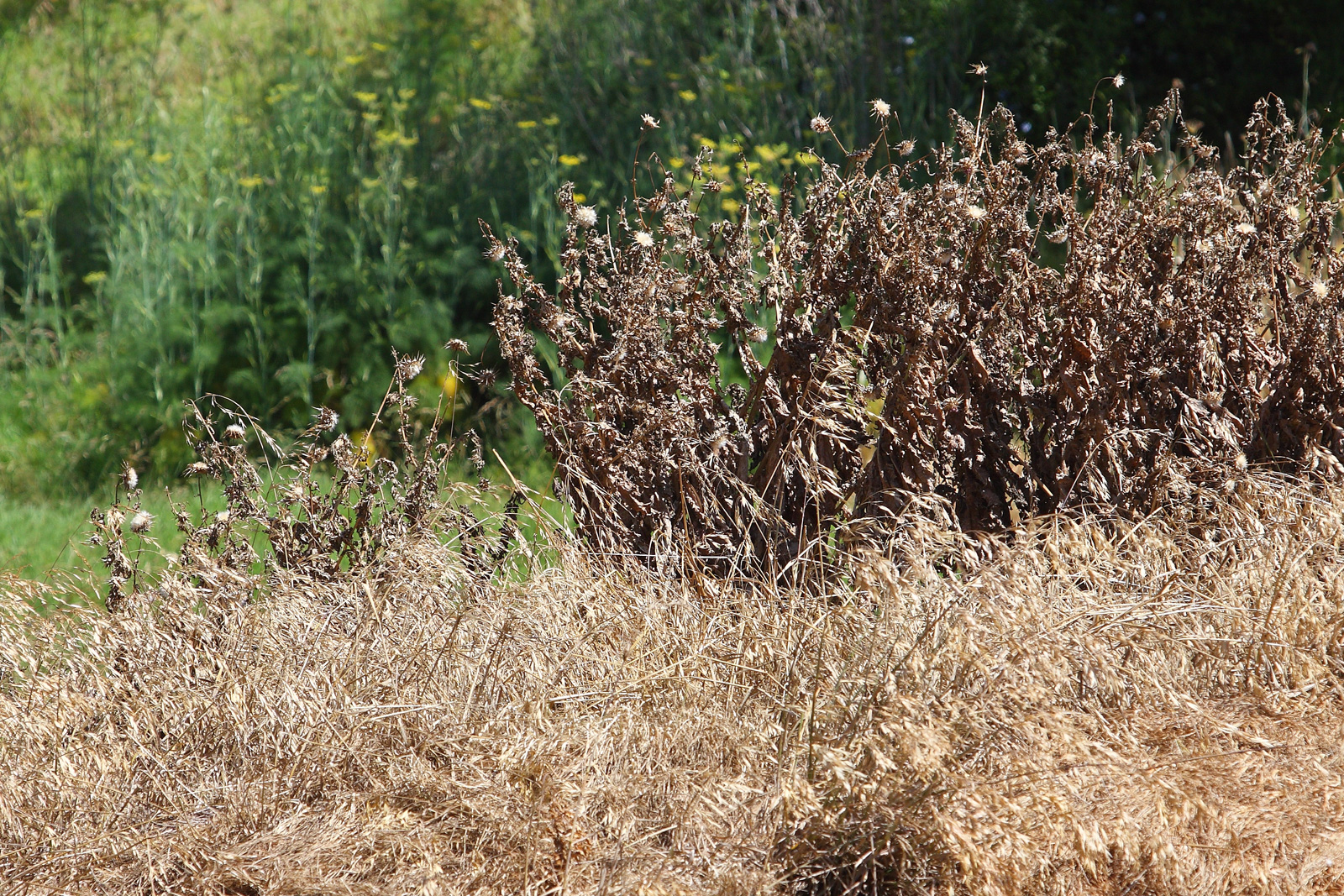
Weeds controlled with herbicide

Herbicides (US: /ˈɜːrbɪsaɪdz/, UK: /ˈhɜːr-/), also commonly known as weed killers, are substances used to control undesired plants, also known as weeds. Selective herbicides control specific weed species while leaving the desired crop relatively unharmed, while non-selective herbicides (sometimes called "total weed killers") kill plants indiscriminately. The combined effects of herbicides, nitrogen fertilizer, and improved cultivars has increased yields (per acre) of major crops by three to six times from 1900 to 2000.

In the United States in 2012, about 91% of all herbicide usage was, determined by weight, applied in agriculture. In 2012, world pesticide expenditures totaled nearly US$24.7 billion; herbicides were about 44% of those sales and constituted the biggest portion, followed by insecticides, fungicides, and fumigants. Herbicide is also used in forestry, where certain formulations have been found to suppress hardwood varieties in favor of conifers after clearcutting, as well as pasture systems.

== History ==
Prior to the widespread use of herbicides, cultural controls, such as altering soil pH, salinity, or fertility levels, were used to control weeds. Mechanical control including tillage and flooding were also used to control weeds. In the late 19th and early 20th centuries, inorganic chemicals such as sulfuric acid, arsenic, copper salts, kerosene and sodium chlorate were used to control weeds, but these chemicals were either toxic, flammable or corrosive and were expensive and ineffective at controlling weeds.

=== First herbicides ===
2,4-D, the first selective chemical herbicide, was discovered during the Second World War.

The major breakthroughs occurred during the Second World War as the result of research conducted independently in the United Kingdom and the United States into the potential use of herbicides in war. The compound 2,4-D was first synthesized by W. G. Templeman at Imperial Chemical Industries. In 1940, his work with indoleacetic acid and naphthaleneacetic acid indicated that "growth substances applied appropriately would kill certain broad-leaved weeds in cereals without harming the crops," though these substances were too expensive and too short-lived in soil due to degradation by microorganisms to be of practical agricultural use; by 1941, his team succeeded in synthesizing a wide range of chemicals to achieve the same effect at lower cost and better efficacy, including 2,4-D. In the same year, R. Pokorny in the US achieved this as well. Independently, a team under Juda Hirsch Quastel, working at the Rothamsted Experimental Station made the same discovery. Quastel was tasked by the Agricultural Research Council (ARC) to discover methods for improving crop yield. By analyzing soil as a dynamic system, rather than an inert substance, he was able to apply techniques such as perfusion. Quastel was able to quantify the influence of various plant hormones, inhibitors, and other chemicals on the activity of microorganisms in the soil and assess their direct impact on plant growth. While the full work of the unit remained secret, certain discoveries were developed for commercial use after the war, including the 2,4-D compound.

When 2,4-D was commercially released in 1946, it became the first successful selective herbicide, triggering a worldwide revolution in agricultural output. It allowed for greatly enhanced weed control in wheat, maize (corn), rice, and similar cereal grass crops, because it kills dicots (broadleaf plants), but not most monocots (grasses). The low cost of 2,4-D has led to continued usage today, and it remains one of the most commonly used herbicides in the world. Like other acid herbicides, current formulations use either an amine salt (often trimethylamine) or one of many esters of the parent compound.

=== Further discoveries ===
The triazine family of herbicides, which includes atrazine, was introduced in the 1950s; they have the current distinction of being the herbicide family of greatest concern regarding groundwater contamination. Atrazine does not break down readily (within a few weeks) after being applied to soils of above-neutral pH. Under alkaline soil conditions, atrazine may be carried into the soil profile as far as the water table by soil water following rainfall causing the aforementioned contamination. Atrazine is thus said to have "carryover", a generally undesirable property for herbicides.

Glyphosate had been first prepared in the 1950s but its herbicidal activity was only recognized in the 1960s. It was marketed as Roundup in 1971. Since the development of glyphosate-resistant crop plants, it is now used very extensively for selective weed control in growing crops. The pairing of the herbicide with the resistant seed contributed to the consolidation of the seed and chemistry industry in the late 1990s.

Many modern herbicides used in agriculture and gardening are specifically formulated to degrade within a short period after application.

== Terminology ==
Herbicides can be classified/grouped in various ways; for example, according to their activity, the timing of application, method of application, mechanism of their action, and their chemical structures.

=== Selectivity ===
Chemical structure of the herbicide is of primary affecting efficacy. 2,4-D, mecoprop, and dicamba control many broadleaf weeds but remain ineffective against turf grasses.

Chemical additives influence selectivity. Surfactants alter the physical properties of the spray solution and the overall phytotoxicity of the herbicide, increasing translocation. Herbicide safeners enhance the selectivity by boosting herbicide resistance by the crop but allowing the herbicide to damage the weed.

Selectivity is determined by the circumstances and technique of application. Climatic factors affect absorption including humidity, light, precipitation, and temperature. Foliage-applied herbicides will enter the leaf more readily at high humidity by lengthening the drying time of the spray droplet and increasing cuticle hydration. Light of high intensity may break down some herbicides and cause the leaf cuticle to thicken, which can interfere with absorption. Precipitation may wash away or remove some foliage-applied herbicides, but it will increase root absorption of soil-applied herbicides. Drought-stressed plants are less likely to translocate herbicides. As temperature increases, herbicides' performance may decrease. Absorption and translocation may be reduced in very cold weather.

=== Non-selective herbicides ===
Non-selective herbicides, generally known as defoliants, are used to clear industrial sites, waste grounds, railways, and railway embankments. Paraquat, glufosinate, and glyphosate are non-selective herbicides.

=== Timing of application ===
- Preplant: Preplant herbicides are nonselective herbicides applied to the soil before planting. Some preplant herbicides may be mechanically incorporated into the soil. The objective for incorporation is to prevent dissipation through photodecomposition and/or volatility. The herbicides kill weeds as they grow through the herbicide-treated zone. Volatile herbicides have to be incorporated into the soil before planting the pasture. Crops grown in soil treated with a preplant herbicide include tomatoes, corn, soybeans, and strawberries. Soil fumigants like metam-sodium and dazomet are in use as preplant herbicides.
- Preemergence: Preemergence herbicides are applied before the weed seedlings emerge through the soil surface. Herbicides do not prevent weeds from germinating but they kill weeds as they grow through the herbicide-treated zone by affecting the cell division in the emerging seedling. Dithiopyr and pendimethalin are preemergence herbicides. Weeds that have already emerged before application or activation are not affected by pre-herbicides as their primary growing point escapes the treatment.
- Postemergence: These herbicides are applied after weed seedlings have emerged through the soil surface. They can be foliar or root absorbed, selective or nonselective, and contact or systemic. Application of these herbicides is avoided during rain since being washed off the soil makes it ineffective. 2,4-D is a selective, systemic, foliar-absorbed postemergence herbicide.

=== Method of application ===
- Soil applied: Herbicides applied to the soil are usually taken up by the root or shoot of the emerging seedlings and are used as preplant or preemergence treatment. Several factors influence the effectiveness of soil-applied herbicides. Weeds absorb herbicides by both passive and active mechanisms. Herbicide adsorption to soil colloids or organic matter often reduces the amount available for weed absorption. Positioning of the herbicide in the correct layer of soil is very important, which can be achieved mechanically and by rainfall. Herbicides on the soil surface are subjected to several processes that reduce their availability. Volatility and photolysis are two common processes that reduce the availability of herbicides. Many soil-applied herbicides are absorbed through plant shoots while they are still underground leading to their death or injury. EPTC and trifluralin are soil-applied herbicides.
- Foliar applied: These are applied to a portion of the plant above the ground and are absorbed by exposed tissues. These are generally postemergence herbicides and can either be translocated (systemic) throughout the plant or remain at a specific site (contact). External barriers of plants like cuticles, waxes, cell walls etc. affect herbicide absorption and action. Glyphosate, 2,4-D, and dicamba are foliar-applied herbicides.

=== Persistence ===
An herbicide is described as having low residual activity if it is neutralized within a short time of application (within a few weeks or months) – typically this is due to rainfall, or reactions in the soil. A herbicide described as having high residual activity will remain potent for the long term in the soil. For some compounds, the residual activity can leave the ground almost permanently barren.

== Mechanism of action ==
Herbicides classified by their mechanism of action

Herbicides interfere with the biochemical machinery that supports plant growth. Herbicides often mimic natural plant hormones, enzyme substrates, and cofactors. They interfere with the metabolism in the target plants. Herbicides are often classified according to their site of action because as a general rule, herbicides within the same site of action class produce similar symptoms on susceptible plants. Classification based on the site of action of the herbicide is preferable as herbicide resistance management can be handled more effectively. Classification by mechanism of action (MOA) indicates the first enzyme, protein, or biochemical step affected in the plant following application:

- ACCase inhibitors: Acetyl coenzyme A carboxylase (ACCase) is part of the first step of lipid synthesis. Thus, ACCase inhibitors affect cell membrane production in the meristems of the grass plant. The ACCases of grasses are sensitive to these herbicides, whereas the ACCases of dicot plants are not.
- ALS inhibitors: Acetolactate synthase (ALS; also known as acetohydroxyacid synthase, or AHAS) is part of the first step in the synthesis of the branched-chain amino acids (valine, leucine, and isoleucine). These herbicides slowly starve affected plants of these amino acids, which eventually leads to the inhibition of DNA synthesis. They affect grasses and dicots alike. The ALS inhibitor family includes various sulfonylureas (SUs) (such as flazasulfuron and metsulfuron-methyl), imidazolinones (IMIs), triazolopyrimidines (TPs), pyrimidinyl oxybenzoates (POBs), and sulfonylamino carbonyl triazolinones (SCTs). The ALS biological pathway exists only in plants and microorganisms (but not animals), thus making the ALS-inhibitors among the safest herbicides.
- EPSPS inhibitors: Enolpyruvylshikimate 3-phosphate synthase enzyme (EPSPS) is used in the synthesis of the amino acids tryptophan, phenylalanine and tyrosine. They affect grasses and dicots alike. Glyphosate (Roundup) is a systemic EPSPS inhibitor inactivated by soil contact.
- Auxin-like herbicides: The discovery of synthetic auxins inaugurated the era of organic herbicides. They were discovered in the 1940s after a long study of the plant growth regulator auxin. Synthetic auxins mimic this plant hormone in some way. They have several points of action on the cell membrane, and are effective in the control of dicot plants. 2,4-D, 2,4,5-T, and Aminopyralid are examples of synthetic auxin herbicides.
- Photosystem II inhibitors reduce electron flow from water to NADP^{+} at the photochemical step in photosynthesis. They bind to the Qb site on the D1 protein, and prevent quinone from binding to this site. Therefore, this group of compounds causes electrons to accumulate on chlorophyll molecules. As a consequence, oxidation reactions in excess of those normally tolerated by the cell occur, killing the plant. The triazine herbicides (including simazine, cyanazine, atrazine) and urea derivatives (diuron) are photosystem II inhibitors. Other members of this class are chlorbromuron, pyrazon, isoproturon, bromacil, and terbacil.
- Photosystem I inhibitors steal electrons from ferredoxins, specifically the normal pathway through FeS to Fdx to NADP^{+}, leading to direct discharge of electrons on oxygen. As a result, reactive oxygen species are produced and oxidation reactions in excess of those normally tolerated by the cell occur, leading to plant death. Bipyridinium herbicides (such as diquat and paraquat) inhibit the FeS to Fdx step of that chain, while diphenyl ether herbicides (such as nitrofen, nitrofluorfen, and acifluorfen) inhibit the Fdx to NADP^{+} step.
- HPPD inhibitors inhibit 4-hydroxyphenylpyruvate dioxygenase, which are involved in tyrosine breakdown. Tyrosine breakdown products are used by plants to make carotenoids, which protect chlorophyll in plants from being destroyed by sunlight. If this happens, the plants turn white due to complete loss of chlorophyll, and the plants die. Mesotrione and sulcotrione are herbicides in this class; a drug, nitisinone, was discovered in the course of developing this class of herbicides.

Complementary to mechanism-based classifications, herbicides are often classified according to their chemical structures or motifs. Similar structural types work in similar ways. For example, aryloxyphenoxypropionates herbicides (diclofop chlorazifop, fluazifop) appear to all act as ACCase inhibitors. The so-called cyclohexanedione herbicides, which are used against grasses, include the following commercial products cycloxydim, clethodim, tralkoxydim, butroxydim, sethoxydim, profoxydim, and mesotrione. Knowing about herbicide chemical family grouping serves as a short-term strategy for managing resistance to site of action. The phenoxyacetic acid mimic the natural auxin indoleacetic acid (IAA). This family includes MCPA, 2,4-D, and 2,4,5-T, picloram, dicamba, clopyralid, and triclopyr.

=== WSSA and HRAC classification ===
Using the Weed Science Society of America (WSSA) and herbicide Resistance and World Grains (HRAC) systems, herbicides are classified by mode of action. Eventually the Herbicide Resistance Action Committee (HRAC) and the Weed Science Society of America (WSSA) developed a classification system. Groups in the WSSA and the HRAC systems are designated by numbers and letters, inform users awareness of herbicide mode of action and provide more accurate recommendations for resistance management.

== Use and application ==
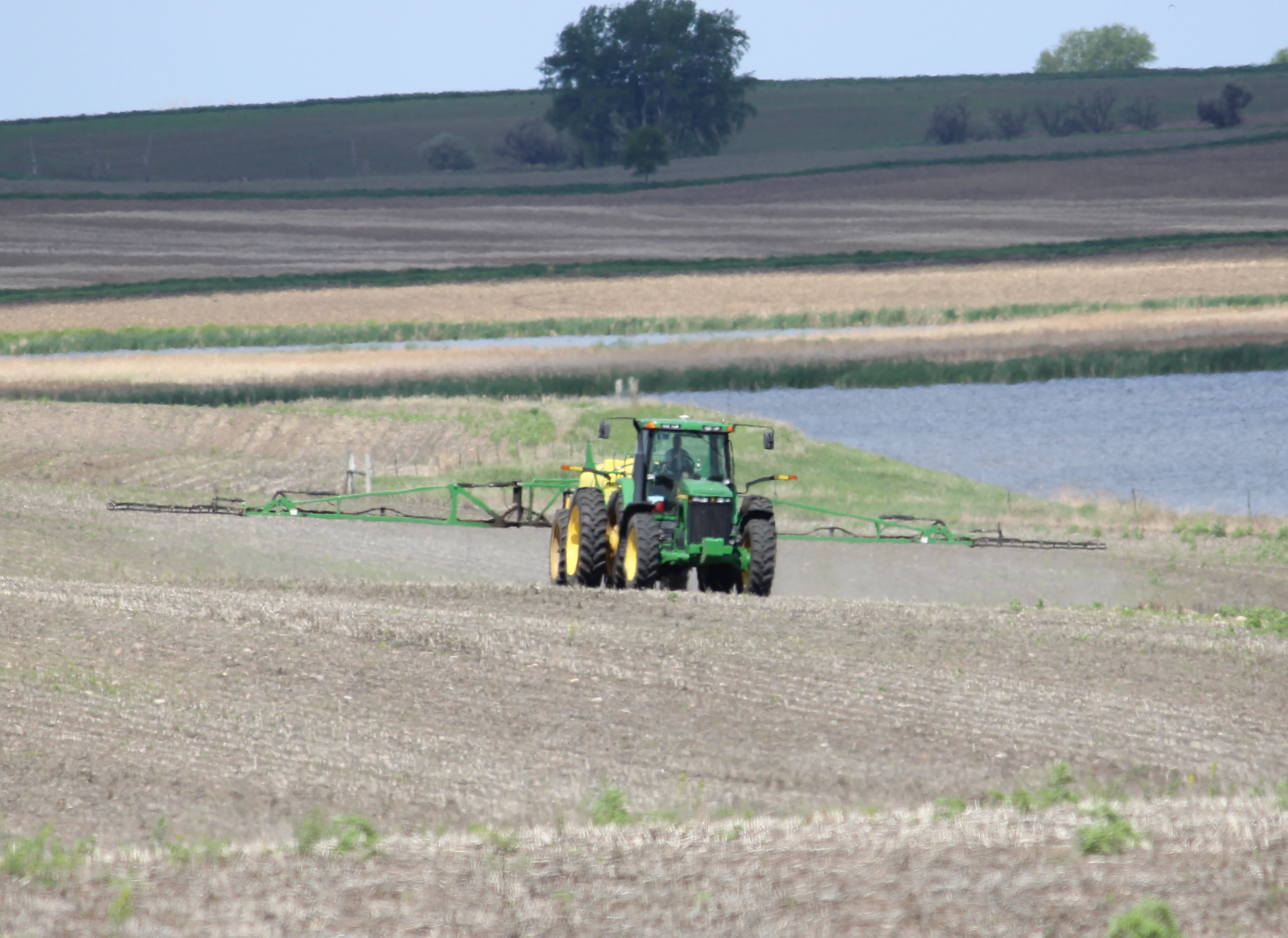
Herbicides being sprayed from the spray arms of a tractor in North Dakota.

Most herbicides are applied as water-based sprays using ground equipment. Ground equipment varies in design, but large areas can be sprayed using self-propelled sprayers equipped with long booms, of 60 to 120 feet (18 to 37 m) with spray nozzles spaced every 20–30 inches (510–760 mm) apart. Towed, handheld, and even horse-drawn sprayers are also used. On large areas, herbicides may also at times be applied aerially using helicopters or airplanes, or through irrigation systems (known as chemigation).

Weed-wiping may also be used, where a wick wetted with herbicide is suspended from a boom and dragged or rolled across the tops of the taller weed plants. This allows treatment of taller grassland weeds by direct contact without affecting related but desirable shorter plants in the grassland sward beneath. The method has the benefit of avoiding spray drift. In Wales, a scheme offering free weed-wiper hire was launched in 2015 in an effort to reduce the levels of MCPA in water courses.

There is little difference in forestry in the early growth stages, when the height similarities between growing trees and growing annual crops yields a similar problem with weed competition. Unlike with annuals however, application is mostly unnecessary thereafter and is thus mostly used to decrease the delay between productive economic cycles of lumber crops.

=== Misuse and misapplication ===
Herbicide volatilisation or spray drift may result in herbicide affecting neighboring fields or plants, particularly in windy conditions. Sometimes, the wrong field or plants may be sprayed due to error.

=== Use politically, militarily, and in conflict ===
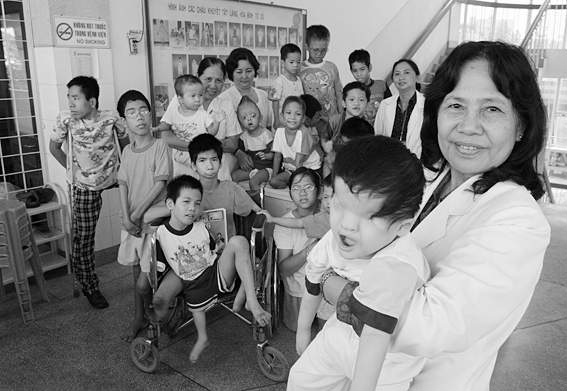
Handicapped children in Vietnam, most of them victims of Agent Orange, 2004

Although herbicidal warfare uses chemical substances, its main purpose is to disrupt agricultural food production or to destroy plants which provide cover or concealment to the enemy. During the Malayan Emergency, British Commonwealth forces deployed herbicides and defoliants in the Malaysian countryside in order to deprive Malayan National Liberation Army (MNLA) insurgents of cover, potential sources of food and to flush them out of the jungle. Deployment of herbicides and defoliants served the dual purpose of thinning jungle trails to prevent ambushes and destroying crop fields in regions where the MNLA was active to deprive them of potential sources of food. As part of this process, herbicides and defoliants were also sprayed from Royal Air Force aircraft.

The use of herbicides as a chemical weapon by the U.S. military during the Vietnam War has left tangible, long-term impacts upon the Vietnamese people and U.S soldiers that handled the chemicals. More than 20% of South Vietnam's forests and 3.2% of its cultivated land were sprayed at least once between during the war. The government of Vietnam says that up to four million people in Vietnam were exposed to the defoliant, and as many as three million people have suffered illness because of Agent Orange, while the Viet Nam Red Cross Society estimates that up to one million people were disabled or have health problems as a result of exposure to Agent Orange. The United States government has described these figures as unreliable.

== Health and environmental effects ==
=== Human health ===
Many questions exist about herbicides' health and environmental effects, because of the many kinds of herbicide and the myriad potential targets, mostly unintended. For example, a 1995 panel of 13 scientists reviewing studies on the carcinogenicity of 2,4-D had divided opinions on the likelihood 2,4-D causes cancer in humans. As of 1992, studies on phenoxy herbicides were too few to accurately assess the risk of many types of cancer from these herbicides, even although evidence was stronger that exposure to these herbicides is associated with increased risk of soft tissue sarcoma and non-Hodgkin lymphoma. Exposure to paraquat, an herbicide with widespread use, has been strongly linked to the development of Parkinson's disease.

Toxicity

Herbicides have widely variable toxicity. Acute toxicity, short term exposure effects, and chronic toxicity, from long term environmental or occupational exposure. Much public suspicion of herbicides confuses valid statements of acute toxicity with equally valid statements of lack of chronic toxicity at the recommended levels of usage. For instance, while glyphosate formulations with tallowamine adjuvants are acutely toxic, their use was found to be uncorrelated with any health issues like cancer in a massive US Department of Health study on 90,000 members of farmer families for over a period of 23 years. That is, the study shows lack of chronic toxicity, but cannot question the herbicide's acute toxicity.

Health effects

Some herbicides cause a range of health effects ranging from skin rashes to death. The pathway of attack can arise from intentional or unintentional direct consumption, improper application resulting in the herbicide coming into direct contact with people or wildlife, inhalation of aerial sprays, or food consumption prior to the labelled preharvest interval. Under some conditions, certain herbicides can be transported via leaching or surface runoff to contaminate groundwater or distant surface water sources. Generally, the conditions that promote herbicide transport include intense storm events (particularly shortly after application) and soils with limited capacity to adsorb or retain the herbicides. Herbicide properties that increase likelihood of transport include persistence (resistance to degradation) and high water solubility.

Contamination

Cases have been reported where Phenoxy herbicides are contaminated with dioxins such as TCDD; research has suggested such contamination results in a small rise in cancer risk after occupational exposure to these herbicides. Triazine exposure has been implicated in a likely relationship to increased risk of breast cancer, although a causal relationship remains unclear.

False claims

Herbicide manufacturers have at times made false or misleading claims about the safety of their products. Chemical manufacturer Monsanto Company agreed to change its advertising after pressure from New York attorney general Dennis Vacco; Vacco complained about misleading claims that its spray-on glyphosate-based herbicides, including Roundup, were safer than table salt and "practically non-toxic" to mammals, birds, and fish (though proof that this was ever said is hard to find). Roundup is toxic and has resulted in death after being ingested in quantities ranging from 85 to 200 ml, although it has also been ingested in quantities as large as 500 ml with only mild or moderate symptoms. The manufacturer of Tordon 101 (Dow AgroSciences, owned by the Dow Chemical Company) has claimed Tordon 101 has no effects on animals and insects, in spite of evidence of strong carcinogenic activity of the active ingredient, picloram, in studies on rats.

=== Ecological effects ===
Herbicide use generally has negative impacts on many aspects of the environment. Insects, non-targeted plants, animals, and aquatic systems subject to serious damage from herbicides. Impacts are highly variable.

Bioaccumulation is a concern, both in terrestrial and aquatic environments, and is heavily dependent on both the kind of herbicide and the conditions. For example, fish in dark aquariums bioaccumulated 14 times more trifluralin than fish kept in well lit aquariums in a 1977 study.

==== Aquatic life ====
Atrazine and 2,4-dichlorophenoxyacetic acid have often been blamed for affecting reproductive behavior of aquatic life. A review in 2008 found that the data do not support this assertion in regards to atrazine, but later works find these herbicides as having a detrimental effect on aquatic plant, invertebrate, and vertebrate life, as well as disrupting microbial communities in soil.

==== Bird populations ====
Bird populations are one of many indicators of herbicide damage. Most observed effects are due not to toxicity, but to habitat changes and the decreases in abundance of species on which birds rely for food or shelter. Herbicide use in silviculture, used to favor certain types of growth following clearcutting, can cause significant drops in bird populations. Even when herbicides which have low toxicity to birds are used, they decrease the abundance of many types of vegetation on which the birds rely. Herbicide use in agriculture in the UK has been linked to a decline in seed-eating bird species which rely on the weeds killed by the herbicides. Heavy use of herbicides in neotropical agricultural areas has been one of many factors implicated in limiting the usefulness of such agricultural land for wintering migratory birds.

== Resistance ==
One major complication to the use of herbicides for weed control is the ability of plants to evolve herbicide resistance, rendering the herbicides ineffective against target plants. Out of 31 known herbicide modes of action, weeds have evolved resistance to 21. 268 plant species are known to have evolved herbicide resistance at least once. Herbicide resistance was first observed in 1957, and since has evolved repeatedly in weed species from 30 families across the globe. Weed resistance to herbicides has become a major concern in crop production worldwide.

Resistance to herbicides is often attributed to overuse as well as the strong evolutionary pressure on the affected weeds. Three agricultural practices account for the evolutionary pressure upon weeds to evolve resistance: monoculture, neglecting non-herbicide weed control practices, and reliance on one herbicide for weed control. To minimize resistance, rotational programs of herbicide application, where herbicides with multiple modes of action are used, have been widely promoted. In particular, glyphosate resistance evolved rapidly in part because when glyphosate use first began, it was continuously and heavily relied upon for weed control. This caused incredibly strong selective pressure upon weeds, encouraging mutations conferring glyphosate resistance to persist and spread.

However, in 2015, an expansive study showed an increase in herbicide resistance as a result of rotation, and instead recommended mixing multiple herbicides for simultaneous application. As of 2023, the effectiveness of combining herbicides is also questioned, particularly in light of the rise of non-target site resistance.

Plants developed resistance to atrazine and to ALS-inhibitors relatively early, but more recently, glyphosate resistance has dramatically risen. Marestail is one weed that has developed glyphosate resistance. Glyphosate-resistant weeds are present in the vast majority of soybean, cotton and corn farms in some U.S. states. Weeds that can resist multiple other herbicides are spreading. Few new herbicides are near commercialization, and none with a molecular mode of action for which there is no resistance. Because most herbicides could not kill all weeds, farmers rotate crops and herbicides to stop the development of resistant weeds.

A 2008–2009 survey of 144 populations of waterhemp in 41 Missouri counties revealed glyphosate resistance in 69%. Weeds from some 500 sites throughout Iowa in 2011 and 2012 revealed glyphosate resistance in approximately 64% of waterhemp samples. As of 2023, 58 weed species have developed glyphosate resistance. Weeds resistant to multiple herbicides with completely different biological action modes are on the rise. In Missouri, 43% of waterhemp samples were resistant to two different herbicides; 6% resisted three; and 0.5% resisted four. In Iowa 89% of waterhemp samples resist two or more herbicides, 25% resist three, and 10% resist five.

As of 2023, Palmer amaranth with resistance to six different herbicide modes of action has emerged. Annual bluegrass collected from a golf course in the U.S. state of Tennessee was found in 2020 to be resistant to seven herbicides at once. Rigid ryegrass and annual bluegrass share the distinction of the species with confirmed resistance to the largest number of herbicide modes of action, both with confirmed resistance to 12 different modes of action; however, this number references how many forms of herbicide resistance are known to have emerged in the species at some point, not how many have been found simultaneously in a single plant.

In 2015, Monsanto released crop seed varieties resistant to both dicamba and glyphosate, allowing for use of a greater variety of herbicides on fields without harming the crops. By 2020, five years after the release of dicamba-resistant seed, the first example of dicamba-resistant Palmer amaranth was found in one location.

=== Evolutionary insights ===
When mutations occur in the genes responsible for the biological mechanisms that herbicides interfere with, these mutations may cause the herbicide mode of action to work less effectively. This is called target-site resistance. Specific mutations that have the most helpful effect for the plant have been shown to occur in separate instances and dominate throughout resistant weed populations. This is an example of convergent evolution. Some mutations conferring herbicide resistance may have fitness costs, reducing the plant's ability to survive in other ways, but over time, the least costly mutations tend to dominate in weed populations.

Recently, incidences of non-target site resistance have increasingly emerged, such as examples where plants are capable of producing enzymes that neutralize herbicides before they can enter the plant's cells – metabolic resistance. This form of resistance is particularly challenging, since plants can develop non-target-site resistance to herbicides their ancestors were never directly exposed to.

=== Biochemistry of resistance ===
Resistance to herbicides can be based on one of the following biochemical mechanisms:

- Target-site resistance: In target-site resistance, the genetic change that causes the resistance directly alters the chemical mechanism the herbicide targets. The mutation may relate to an enzyme with a crucial function in a metabolic pathway, or to a component of an electron-transport system. For example, ALS-resistant weeds developed by genetic mutations leading to an altered enzyme. Such changes render the herbicide impotent. Target-site resistance may also be caused by an over-expression of the target enzyme (via gene amplification or changes in a gene promoter). A related mechanism is that an adaptable enzyme such as cytochrome P450 is redesigned to neutralize the pesticide itself.
- Non-target-site resistance: In non-target-site resistance, the genetic change giving resistance is not directly related to the target site, but causes the plant to be less susceptible by some other means. Some mechanisms include metabolic detoxification of the herbicide in the weed, reduced uptake and translocation, sequestration of the herbicide, or reduced penetration of the herbicide into the leaf surface. These mechanisms all cause less of the herbicide's active ingredient to reach the target site in the first place.

The following terms are also used to describe cases where plants are resistant to multiple herbicides at once:

- Cross-resistance: In this case, a single resistance mechanism causes resistance to several herbicides. The term target-site cross-resistance is used when the herbicides bind to the same target site, whereas non-target-site cross-resistance is due to a single non-target-site mechanism (e.g., enhanced metabolic detoxification) that entails resistance across herbicides with different sites of action.
- Multiple resistance: In this situation, two or more resistance mechanisms are present within individual plants, or within a plant population.

=== Resistance management ===
Due to herbicide resistance – a major concern in agriculture – a number of products combine herbicides with different means of action. Integrated pest management may use herbicides alongside other pest control methods.

Integrated weed management (IWM) approach utilizes several tactics to combat weeds and forestall resistance. This approach relies less on herbicides and so selection pressure should be reduced. By relying on diverse weed control methods, including non-herbicide methods of weed control, the selection pressure on weeds to evolve resistance can be lowered. Researchers warn that if herbicide resistance is combatted only with more herbicides, "evolution will most likely win." In 2017, the USEPA issued a revised Pesticide Registration Notice (PRN 2017-1), which provides guidance to pesticide registrants on required pesticide resistance management labeling. This requirement applies to all conventional pesticides and is meant to provide end-users with guidance on managing pesticide resistance. An example of a fully executed label compliant with the USEPA resistance management labeling guidance can be seen on the specimen label for the herbicide cloransulam-methyl, updated in 2022.

Optimising herbicide input to the economic threshold level should avoid the unnecessary use of herbicides and reduce selection pressure. Herbicides should be used to their greatest potential by ensuring that the timing, dose, application method, soil and climatic conditions are optimal for good activity. In the UK, partially resistant grass weeds such as Alopecurus myosuroides (blackgrass) and Avena genus (wild oat) can often be controlled adequately when herbicides are applied at the 2-3 leaf stage, whereas later applications at the 2-3 tiller stage can fail badly. Patch spraying, or applying herbicide to only the badly infested areas of fields, is another means of reducing total herbicide use.

Agronomic factors influencing the risk of herbicide resistance development
Factor	Low risk	High risk
Cropping system	Good rotation	Crop monoculture
Cultivation system	Annual ploughing	Continuous minimum tillage
Weed control	Cultural only	Herbicide only
Herbicide use	Many modes of action	Single modes of action
Control in previous years	Excellent	Poor
Weed infestation	Low	High
Resistance in vicinity	Unknown	Common

=== Approaches to treating resistant weeds ===
==== Alternative herbicides ====
When resistance is first suspected or confirmed, the efficacy of alternatives is likely to be the first consideration. If there is resistance to a single group of herbicides, then the use of herbicides from other groups may provide a simple and effective solution, at least in the short term. For example, many triazine-resistant weeds have been readily controlled by the use of alternative herbicides such as dicamba or glyphosate.

==== Mixtures and sequences ====
The use of two or more herbicides which have differing modes of action can reduce the selection for resistant genotypes. Ideally, each component in a mixture should:

- Be active at different target sites
- Have a high level of efficacy
- Be detoxified by different biochemical pathways
- Have similar persistence in the soil (if it is a residual herbicide)
- Exert negative cross-resistance
- Synergise the activity of the other component

No mixture is likely to have all these attributes, but the first two listed are the most important. There is a risk that mixtures will select for resistance to both components in the longer term. One practical advantage of sequences of two herbicides compared with mixtures is that a better appraisal of the efficacy of each herbicide component is possible, provided that sufficient time elapses between each application. A disadvantage with sequences is that two separate applications have to be made and it is possible that the later application will be less effective on weeds surviving the first application. If these are resistant, then the second herbicide in the sequence may increase selection for resistant individuals by killing the susceptible plants which were damaged but not killed by the first application, but allowing the larger, less affected, resistant plants to survive. This has been cited as one reason why ALS-resistant Stellaria media has evolved in Scotland recently (2000), despite the regular use of a sequence incorporating mecoprop, a herbicide with a different mode of action.

==== Natural herbicide ====
The term organic herbicide has come to mean herbicides intended for organic farming. Few natural herbicides rival the effectiveness of synthetics. Some plants also produce their own herbicides, such as the genus Juglans (walnuts), or the tree of heaven; such actions of natural herbicides, and other related chemical interactions, is called allelopathy. The applicability of these agents is unclear.

=== Farming practices and resistance: a case study ===
Herbicide resistance became a critical problem in Australian agriculture after many Australian sheep farmers began to exclusively grow wheat in their pastures in the 1970s. Introduced varieties of ryegrass, while good for grazing sheep, compete intensely with wheat. Ryegrasses produce so many seeds that, if left unchecked, they can completely choke a field. Herbicides provided excellent control, reducing soil disruption because of less need to plough. Within little more than a decade, ryegrass and other weeds began to develop resistance. In response Australian farmers changed methods. By 1983, patches of ryegrass had become immune to Hoegrass (diclofop-methyl), a family of herbicides that inhibit an enzyme called acetyl coenzyme A carboxylase.

Ryegrass populations were large and had substantial genetic diversity because farmers had planted many varieties. Ryegrass is cross-pollinated by wind, so genes shuffle frequently. To control its distribution, farmers sprayed inexpensive Hoegrass, creating selection pressure. In addition, farmers sometimes diluted the herbicide to save money, which allowed some plants to survive application. Farmers turned to a group of herbicides that block acetolactate synthase when resistance appeared. Once again, ryegrass in Australia evolved a kind of "cross-resistance" that allowed it to break down various herbicides rapidly. Four classes of herbicides become ineffective within a few years. In 2013, only two herbicide classes called Photosystem II and long-chain fatty acid inhibitors, were effective against ryegrass.

== See also ==
- Bioherbicide
- Environmental impact assessment
- HRAC classification
- Index of pesticide articles
- Integrated pest management
- List of environmental health hazards
- Preemergent herbicide
- Soil contamination
- Surface runoff
- Weed control
- Defoliant
