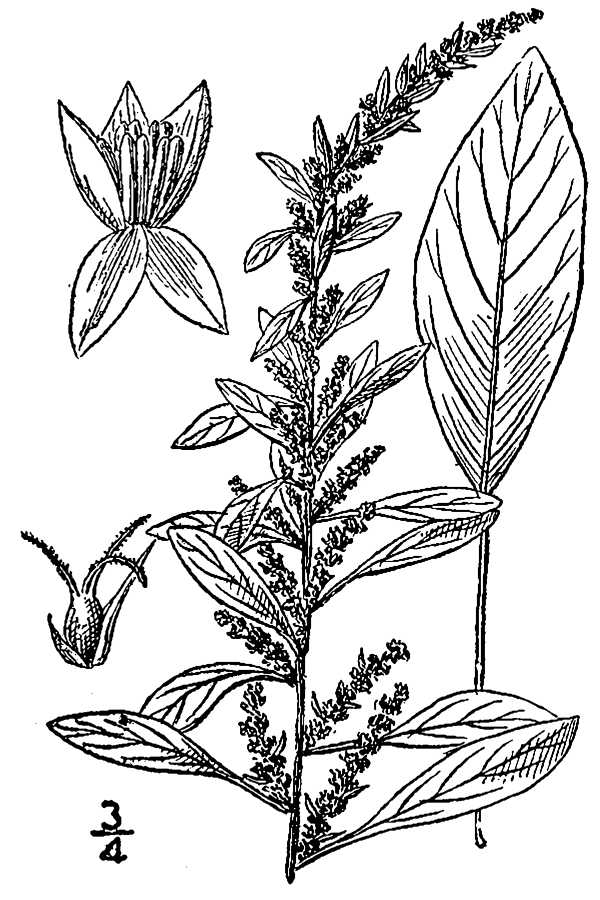
- 1913 illustration

Conservation status
- Least Concern (IUCN 3.1)

Scientific classification
- Kingdom: Plantae
- Clade: Tracheophytes
- Clade: Angiosperms
- Clade: Eudicots
- Order: Caryophyllales
- Family: Amaranthaceae
- Genus: Amaranthus
- Species: A. tuberculatus

Binomial name
- Amaranthus tuberculatus (Moq.) J.D.Sauer

Synonyms
- Acnida altissima Moq. nom. inval.; Acnida cannabina var. prostrata (Uline & W.L. Bray) Fernald; Acnida cannabina var. subnuda (S. Watson) Fernald; Acnida concatenata (Moq.) Small; Acnida subnuda (S.Watson) Standl.; Acnida tamariscina var. concatenata (Moq.) Uline & W.L.Bray; Acnida tamariscina var. prostrata Uline & W.L.Bray; Acnida tamariscina var. subnuda (S.Watson) J.M.Coult.; Acnida tamariscina var. tuberculata (Moq.) Uline & W.L.Bray; Acnida tuberculata Moq.; Amaranthus altissimus Riddell nom. inval.; Amaranthus ambigens Standl.; Amaranthus cannabinus var. concatenatus Moq.; Amaranthus rudis J.D.Sauer; Montelia tamariscina (Nutt.) A. Gray

= Amaranthus tuberculatus =

Species of flowering plant

Amaranthus tuberculatus, commonly known as roughfruit amaranth, rough-fruited water-hemp, tall waterhemp, or common waterhemp, is a species of flowering plant. It is a summer annual broadleaf with a germination period that lasts several months. Tall waterhemp has been reported as a weed in 40 of 50 U.S. states.

== Morphology ==
A distinguishing characteristic of tall waterhemp that sets it apart from similar members of the genus Amaranthus is the lack of hair on its stems and leaves. This characteristic gives the leaves a bright, glossy appearance. The stem is typically erect and slender, which can be up to three feet long with a color of either green or red.

Tall waterhemp is a dioecious plant. The seedhead branches in the female are numerous, short, and smooth. The male seedhead branches are fewer, longer, and more slender than those of the female.

The species has terminal spike inflorescences and very short bracts with simple to highly branched flowers. Seed produced is reddish to black and less than 1/32 inch in diameter.

== Geographic distribution ==
Tall waterhemp is native to North America. It is believed to have originally had a range north of Missouri and Tennessee to the Great Lakes. It is now found in 40 states but is most common in the Great Plains and Great Lakes regions. Tall waterhemp predominantly grows in wet habitats, such as ponds, marshes, lakes, creeks, and other riparian zones. The plant can grow in a variety of climates, including roadways, railroads and agricultural fields.

== Growth and development ==
Tall waterhemp is a summer annual that produces a large number of very small seeds. It is considered an r-strategist. Emergence can span several months and often occurs later in the season than other annual weeds, allowing the weed to evade typical weed control strategies such as herbicide application and tillage. One study observed 80% emergence not occurring until ten weeks after the initial emergence. Extreme temperatures have little effect on seed viability. Germination occurs typically after soil temperature alternation, as this is required to break seed dormancy. Waterhemp has been found to germinate in a wide range of soil and temperature conditions. It has been found to germinate 17 years after seed set.

While tall waterhemp cannot self-pollinate, due to having separate male and female plants, it does not require any vectors for pollination. This allows for wind pollination over large distances, generating a large amount of genetic diversity. Another factor contributing to genetic diversity is the large amount of seed produced. Tall waterhemp in competition with soybean has been reported to produce from between 300,000 and 5,000,000 seeds per plant. Tall waterhemp also has a rapid growth rate, 50–70% greater than other annual weeds.

== Interspecific hybridization ==
Interspecific hybrids of tall waterhemp and Amaranthus hybridus have been observed in experimental fields but have not been observed in agronomic fields.

== Agricultural impacts and control ==
In North America, tall waterhemp is considered a major weed of agricultural fields and other disturbed habitats. The Southern Weed Science Society includes tall waterhemp on their list of weed species. However, it is not listed on the federal noxious weed list or any state lists in the United States. In Europe and other continents where the species has been introduced, naturalization is an infrequent occurrence.

Because of the long germination window for tall waterhemp, a single herbicide application is unlikely to be an effective control strategy. Michigan State University Extension recommends a preemergence application followed by one or more postemergence applications. Some populations of tall waterhemp have been reported resistant to acetolactate synthase inhibiting (ALS) herbicides and the triazines, with some individual weeds being resistant to both herbicide groups. Resistance to acifluorfen and other diphenyl ether herbicides has been reported. Even more alarming is the emergence of waterhemp resistant to the latest generation of herbicides, HPPD inhibitors. Furthermore, waterhemp at a site in Nebraska was found to be resistant to 2,4-D, a phenoxy herbicide.

According to Bob Hartzler of Iowa State University, the most effective control of tall waterhemp is achieved by cultural practices that promote growth of the desired vegetation.
