= Toxophore =

A toxophore is the chemical group that produces the toxic effect in a toxin molecule: commonly used in pharmaceutical and pesticide sciences.
