= Allelopathy =

Production of biochemicals which affect the growth of other organisms

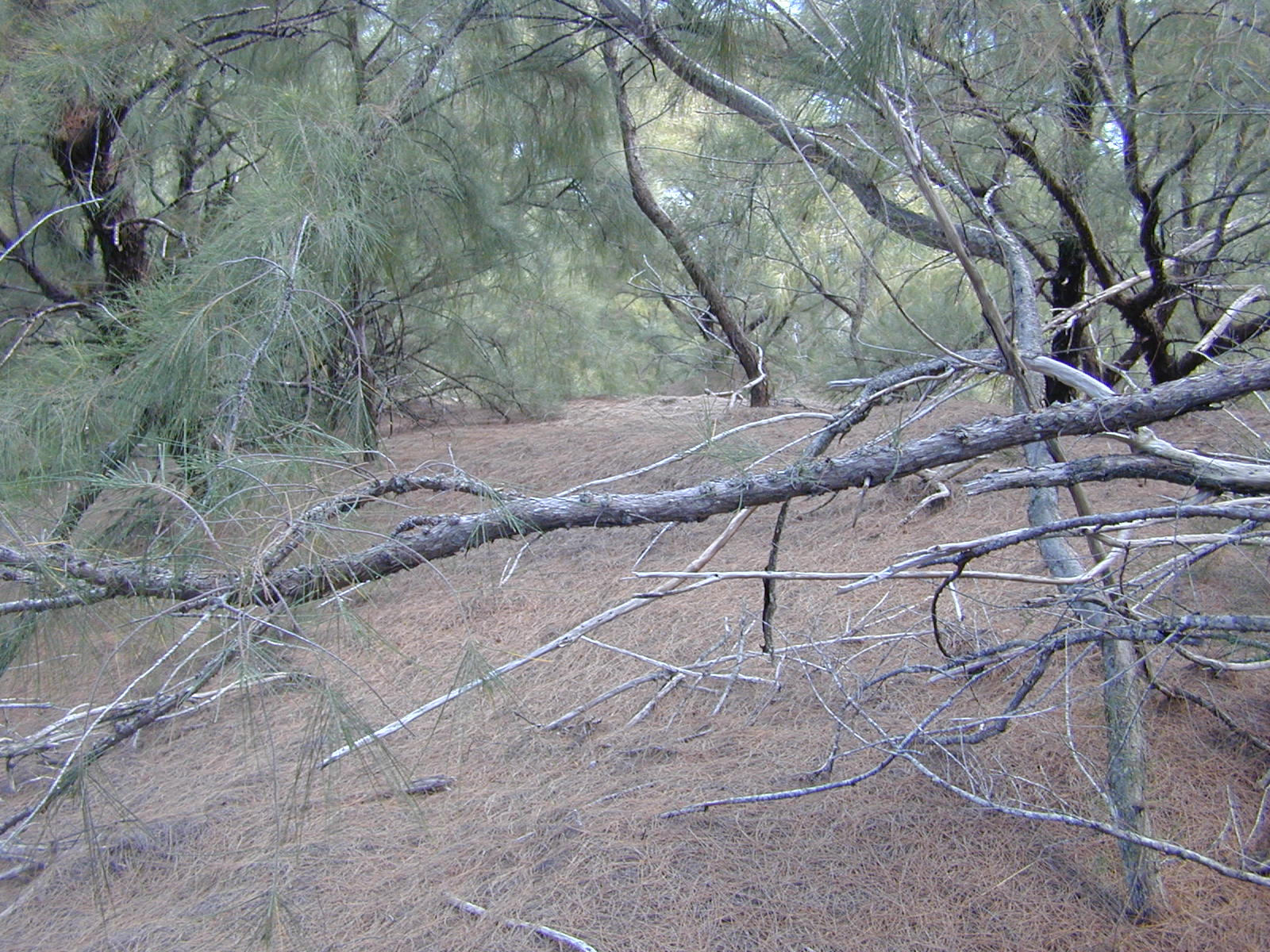
Casuarina equisetifolia litter completely suppresses germination of understory plants as shown here despite the relative openness of the canopy and ample rainfall (>120 cm/yr) at the location.

Allelopathy is a biological phenomenon by which an organism produces one or more biochemicals that influence the germination, growth, survival, and reproduction of other organisms. These biochemicals are known as allelochemicals and can have beneficial (positive allelopathy) or detrimental (negative allelopathy) effects on the target organisms and the community. Allelopathy is often used narrowly to describe chemically mediated competition between plants; however, it is sometimes defined more broadly as chemically mediated competition between any type of organisms. The original concept developed by Hans Molisch in 1937 seemed focused only on interactions between plants, between microorganisms and between microorganisms and plants. Allelochemicals are a subset of secondary metabolites, which are not directly required for metabolism (i.e. growth, development and reproduction) of the allelopathic organism.

Allelopathic interactions are an important factor in determining species distribution and abundance within plant communities, and are also thought to be important in the success of many invasive plants. Examples include black walnut (Juglans nigra), tree of heaven (Ailanthus altissima), black crowberry (Empetrum nigrum), spotted knapweed (Centaurea stoebe), garlic mustard (Alliaria petiolata), Casuarina/Allocasuarina spp., and nut grass (Cyperus rotundus).

Allelopathy is classified as a biotic factor, as it involves chemical interactions between living organisms, most commonly among plants. In allelopathic interactions, certain species release chemical compounds into the environment that inhibit the germination, growth, or reproduction of neighboring organisms. This process provides a competitive advantage to the allelopathic species by directly interfering with the development of potential competitors.

Allelopathy is frequently mistaken for resource competition, another biotic factor in which organisms compete for limited abiotic resources such as sunlight, water, and soil nutrients. However, the two processes are functionally distinct. While allelopathy involves the introduction of inhibitory chemical agents into the environment, resource competition results from the depletion of essential environmental resources. In many ecological contexts, both forms of competition may operate concurrently, complicating efforts to isolate the specific contribution of allelopathy.

Further complexity arises from the fact that certain allelochemicals may indirectly limit resource availability, thereby mimicking the effects of resource competition. Additionally, the production and efficacy of allelochemicals are influenced by a range of environmental variables, including nutrient availability, temperature, and soil pH. Although the existence of allelopathy is widely accepted in ecological literature, individual cases often remain contentious. Moreover, the specific physiological and ecological mechanisms through which allelochemicals affect target species are still the subject of ongoing research.

== History ==
The term allelopathy from the Greek-derived compounds allilon- (αλλήλων) and -pathy (πάθη) (meaning "mutual harm" or "suffering"), was first used in 1937 by the Austrian professor Hans Molisch in the book Der Einfluss einer Pflanze auf die andere - Allelopathie (The Effect of Plants on Each Other - Allelopathy) published in German. He used the term to describe biochemical interactions by means of which a plant inhibits the growth of neighbouring plants. In 1971, Whittaker and Feeny published a review in the journal Science, which proposed an expanded definition of allelochemical interactions that would incorporate all chemical interactions among organisms. In 1984, Elroy Leon Rice in his monograph on allelopathy enlarged the definition to include all direct positive or negative effects of a plant on another plant or on micro-organisms by the liberation of biochemicals into the natural environment. Over the next ten years, the term was used by other researchers to describe broader chemical interactions between organisms, and by 1996 the International Allelopathy Society (IAS) defined allelopathy as "Any process involving secondary metabolites produced by plants, algae, bacteria and fungi that influences the growth and development of agriculture and biological systems." In more recent times, plant researchers have begun to switch back to the original definition of substances that are produced by one plant that inhibit another plant. Confusing the issue more, zoologists have borrowed the term to describe chemical interactions between invertebrates like corals and sponges.

Long before the term allelopathy was used, people observed the negative effects that one plant could have on another. Theophrastus, who lived around 300 BCE noticed the inhibitory effects of pigweed on alfalfa. In China around the first century CE, the author of Shennong Ben Cao Jing, a book on agriculture and medicinal plants, described 267 plants that had pesticidal abilities, including those with allelopathic effects. In 1832, the Swiss botanist De Candolle suggested that crop plant exudates were responsible for an agriculture problem called soil sickness.

Allelopathy is not universally accepted among ecologists. Many have argued that its effects cannot be distinguished from the exploitation competition that occurs when two (or more) organisms attempt to use the same limited resource, to the detriment of one or both. In the 1970s, great effort went into distinguishing competitive and allelopathic effects by some researchers, while in the 1990s others argued that the effects were often interdependent and could not readily be distinguished. In 1994, D. L. Liu and J. V. Lowett at the Department of Agronomy and Soil Science, University of New England in Armidale, New South Wales, Australia, published two papers in the Journal of Chemical Ecology that developed methods to separate the allelochemical effects from other competitive effects, using barley plants and inventing a process to examine the allelochemicals directly. In 1994, M.C. Nilsson at the Swedish University of Agricultural Sciences in Umeå showed in a field study that allelopathy exerted by Empetrum hermaphroditum reduced growth of Scots pine seedlings by ~ 40%, and that below-ground resource competition by E. hermaphroditum accounted for the remaining growth reduction. For this work she inserted PVC-tubes into the ground to reduce below-ground competition or added charcoal to soil surface to reduce the impact of allelopathy, as well as a treatment combining the two methods. However, the use of activated carbon to make inferences about allelopathy has itself been criticized because of the potential for the charcoal to directly affect plant growth by altering nutrient availability.

Some high-profile work on allelopathy has been mired in controversy. For example, the discovery that (−)-catechin was purportedly responsible for the allelopathic effects of the invasive weed Centaurea stoebe was greeted with much fanfare after being published in Science in 2003. One scientist, Dr. Alastair Fitter, was quoted as saying that this study was "so convincing that it will 'now place allelopathy firmly back on center stage.'" However, many of the key papers associated with these findings were later retracted or majorly corrected, after it was found that they contained fabricated data showing unnaturally high levels of catechin in soils surrounding C. stoebe. Subsequent studies from the original lab have not been able to replicate the results from these retracted studies, nor have most independent studies conducted in other laboratories. Thus, it is doubtful whether the levels of (−)-catechin found in soils are high enough to affect competition with neighboring plants. The proposed mechanism of action (acidification of the cytoplasm through oxidative damage) has also been criticized, on the basis that (−)-catechin is actually an antioxidant.

== Examples ==
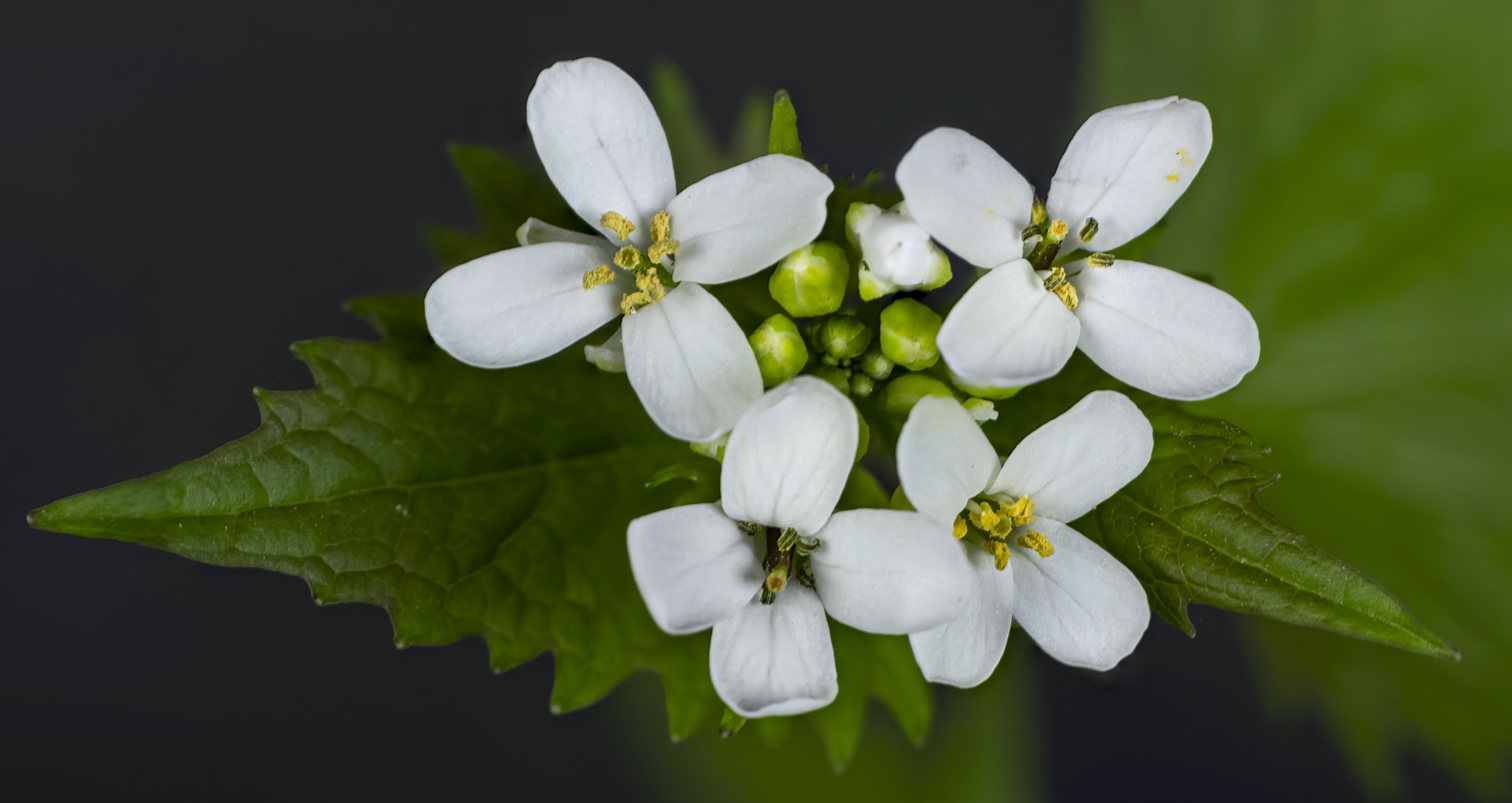
Garlic mustard

Many invasive plant species interfere with native plants through allelopathy. A famous case of purported allelopathy is in desert shrubs. One of the most widely known early examples was Salvia leucophylla, because it was on the cover of the journal Science in 1964. Bare zones around the shrubs were hypothesized to be caused by volatile terpenes emitted by the shrubs. However, like many allelopathy studies, it was based on artificial lab experiments and unwarranted extrapolations to natural ecosystems. In 1970, Science published a study where caging the shrubs to exclude rodents and birds allowed grass to grow in the bare zones. A detailed history of this story can be found in Halsey 2004.

Garlic mustard is another invasive plant species that may owe its success partly to allelopathy. Its success in North American temperate forests may be partly due to its excretion of glucosinolates like sinigrin that can interfere with mutualisms between native tree roots and their mycorrhizal fungi.

Allelopathy has been shown to play a crucial role in forests, influencing the composition of the vegetation growth, and also explains the patterns of forest regeneration. The black walnut (Juglans nigra) produces the allelochemical juglone, which affects some species greatly while others not at all. However, most of the evidence for allelopathic effects of juglone comes from laboratory assays, and it thus remains controversial to what extent juglone affects the growth of competitors under field conditions. The leaf litter and root exudates of some Eucalyptus species are allelopathic for certain soil microbes and plant species. The tree of heaven, Ailanthus altissima, produces allelochemicals in its roots that inhibit the growth of many plants. Spotted knapweed (Centaurea stoebe) is considered an invasive plant that also utilizes allelopathy.

== Applications ==
=== Agriculture ===
Allelochemicals are a useful tool in sustainable farming due to their ability to control weeds. The possible application of allelopathy in agriculture is the subject of much research. Using allelochemical-producing plants in agriculture results in significant suppression of weeds and various pests. Some plants will even reduce the germination rate of other plants by 50%. Current research is focused on the effects of weeds on crops, crops on weeds, and crops on crops. This research furthers the possibility of using allelochemicals as growth regulators and natural herbicides to promote sustainable agriculture. Agricultural practices may be enhanced through the utilization of allelochemical-producing plants. When used correctly, these plants can provide pesticide, herbicide, and antimicrobial qualities to crops. Several such allelochemicals are commercially available or in the process of large-scale manufacture. For example, leptospermone is an allelochemical in lemon bottlebrush (Melaleuca citrina). Although it was found to be too weak as a commercial herbicide, a chemical analog of it, mesotrione (tradename Callisto), was found to be effective. It is sold to control broadleaf weeds in corn, but also seems to be an effective control for crabgrass in lawns. Sheeja (1993) reported the allelopathic interaction of the weeds Chromolaena odorata (Eupatorium odoratum) and Lantana camara on selected major crops.

Many crop cultivars show strong allelopathic properties, of which rice (Oryza sativa) has been most studied. Rice allelopathy depends on variety and origin: Japonica rice is more allelopathic than Indica and Japonica–Indica hybrid. More recently, a critical review on rice allelopathy and the possibility for weed management reported that allelopathic characteristics in rice are quantitatively inherited, and several allelopathy-involved traits have been identified. The use of allelochemicals in agriculture provides for a more environmentally friendly approach to weed control, as they do not leave behind residues. Currently used pesticides and herbicides leak into waterways and result in unsafe water quality. This problem could be eliminated or significantly reduced by using allelochemicals instead of harsh herbicides. The use of cover crops also results in less soil erosion and lessens the need for nitrogen-heavy fertilizers.

== Mechanisms ==
Allelochemical interactions between plants can be performed through various mechanisms, which continue to be studied and refined through ongoing research. Evidence indicates that these compounds can influence plant growth by inhibiting germination, suppressing growth, and disrupting reproductive processes through toxic substance emissions.

=== Germination Inhibitor ===
A germination inhibitor is a chemical compound that prevents seed sprouting by disrupting the signals required for germination. (−)-Catechin is a naturally occurring antioxidant released by spotted knapweed (Centaurea stoebe) and is an example of a potential germination inhibitor. This species produces significantly higher levels of (−)-catechin compared to other plants, facilitating its competitive advantage over native vegetation, including forbs and grasses.

In addition to (−)-catechin, plants such as big sagebrush (Artemisia tridentata) emit volatile compounds including camphor, monoterpene, cineole, and methyl jasmonate (MeJA), all of which have shown qualities to inhibit seed germination. Methyl jasmonate (MeJA), in particular, is highly effective at preventing the germination of native tobacco seeds. Furthermore, when sagebrush is subjected to herbivory, it releases up to 1000 times more MeJA, which further suppresses the germination of nearby plant species. This phenomenon demonstrates how plants use chemical signals to influence interspecific competition and improve their chances of survival. Although these studies mentioned have shown effects on plants when reviewed in a laboratory environment, it continues to be reviewed as research of allelopathic seed germination is difficult to identify and conclude as the determining factor as competition and other a biotic factors cannot be reasoned out as the contributing factor.

=== Growth and Reproduction Suppressor ===
Allelopathic plants release chemical compounds that specifically inhibit the growth and reproductive processes of neighboring plant species. A well-known example is Johnson grass (Sorghum halepense), which synthesizes the allelochemical sorgoleone. This compound plays a critical role in the plant's competitive ability by suppressing the growth and reproductive success of other species. Research has demonstrated that johnson grass significantly affects the distribution of neighboring plants by inhibiting both their growth and reproductive functions.

Growth chamber experiments have shown that leachates from the shoots and roots of Johnson grass substantially reduce the growth and reproductive output of little bluestem (Schizachyrium scoparium), demonstrating the direct effects of allelopathy on plant community dynamics. This inhibition of growth and reproduction promotes the dominance of Johnson grass in areas where it occurs, thereby altering the composition of local plant communities.

== See also ==
- Forest pathology
- Allomone
- Phytochemical
- Semiochemical
