= Specific replant disease =

Disease in fruit trees

Specific replant disease (also known as sick soil syndrome) is a malady that manifests itself when susceptible plants such as apples, pears, plums, cherries and roses are placed into soil previously occupied by a related species. The exact causes are not known, but in the first year the new plants will grow poorly. Root systems are weak and may become blackened, and plants may fail to establish properly.

== Causes ==
One theory is that replant disease is due to a variety of tree pathogens — fungi, bacteria, nematodes, viruses and other organisms. These parasites target the living tissues of the mature tree, hastening senility and death, and survive in the soil and decaying roots after the tree has died. Putting a young traumatized tree with an immature root system into this broth of pathogens can be too much for an infant tree to cope with. Any new root growth is rapidly and heavily colonized, so that shoot growth is virtually zero.

This is especially true if it is on a dwarfing rootstock, which by its nature will be relatively inefficient. As a rule, replant disease persists for around fifteen years in the soil, although this varies with local conditions. Pathogens survive in dead wood and organic matter until exposed to predation by their home rotting away, and will also depend on whether the original orchard was planted with dwarf or standard trees. Standards have more vigorous therefore larger - roots, and are thus likely to take longer to degrade.

== Management ==
=== Crop rotation ===
It is considered good organic crop rotation practice to avoid "like with like" and this rule applies to long lived trees as much as annual vegetables. In the case of temperate fruit trees, the "pomes and stones" rule for rotation should be observed – a "pome" fruit (with an apple-type core, such as apples or pears) should not be followed by a tree from the same group, but by a "stone" fruit (i.e., with a plum-type stone, such as plums or cherries) and vice versa. However, rotation is not always easy in a well-planned old orchard when the site it occupies may well be the best available, and starting another orchard elsewhere may not be practical. In this case, and replanting is unavoidable, a large hole should be dug out, and the soil removed and replaced with clean soil from a site where susceptible plants have not been grown.

=== Increasing root vigor ===
Using trees on vigorous rootstocks which will have a better chance of competing with the pathogens, or plants grown in large containers with a large root ball may also have a better chance of resisting replant disease. The extra time to cropping may be offset if new trees are planted a few years in advance of old trees finally falling over, furthermore, if the old orchard was grubbed — i.e., if trees were healthy when removed, it is unlikely that replant disease would be a problem as pathogen levels may never have been high. The malady is worse where trees have died in situ-pathogens are likely to have contributed to the death and therefore be at a higher level in the soil.

=== Soil fumigation ===
Soil fumigation is another common method employed to control replant disease in both apple and cherry trees. Throughout the 1990s, fumigants like methyl bromide (bromomethane) were commonly used in this way to control and treat the disease, through this was later phased out in the 2000s in favour of more modern alternatives such as chloropicrin, which some studies have shown to be an effective method for resolving specific apple replant disease (SARD) in apple tree monoculture in Europe.
