= Herbicide safener =

Herbicide safeners are organic compounds used to enhance the effectiveness of herbicides, to make them "safer". They minimize the effect of the herbicide on crop plants, thereby improving selectivity between crop plants vs. weed species being targeted by the herbicide. One way that they function is by enhancing the expression of protective enzymes in the crop plant. These protective enzymes might include cytochrome P450.

Herbicide safeners can be used to pretreat crop seeds prior to planting, or they can be sprayed on plants as a mixture with the herbicide.

== Inventory ==
Flurazole is a safener applied to sorghum.

After the discovery of the safener properties of naphthalic anhydride, additional safeners were reported. They are associated with particular crops, such as benoxacor for maize and flurazole for sorghum.

Approximately 20 safeners were in use in 2023. The inventory:

- benoxacor
- BPCMS
- cloquintocet
- cyometrinil
- cyprosulfamide
- dichlormid
- dicyclonon
- dietholate
- fenchlorazole
- fenclorim
- flurazole
- fluxofenim
- furilazole
- isoxadifen
- jiecaowan
- jiecaoxi
- mefenpyr
- mephenate
- metcamifen
- naphthalic anhydride
- oxabetrinil

These safeners have been classified according to structural motifs.
