= 4-Hydroxyphenylpyruvate dioxygenase =

Fe(II)-containing non-heme oxygenase

4-hydroxyphenylpyruvate dioxygenase
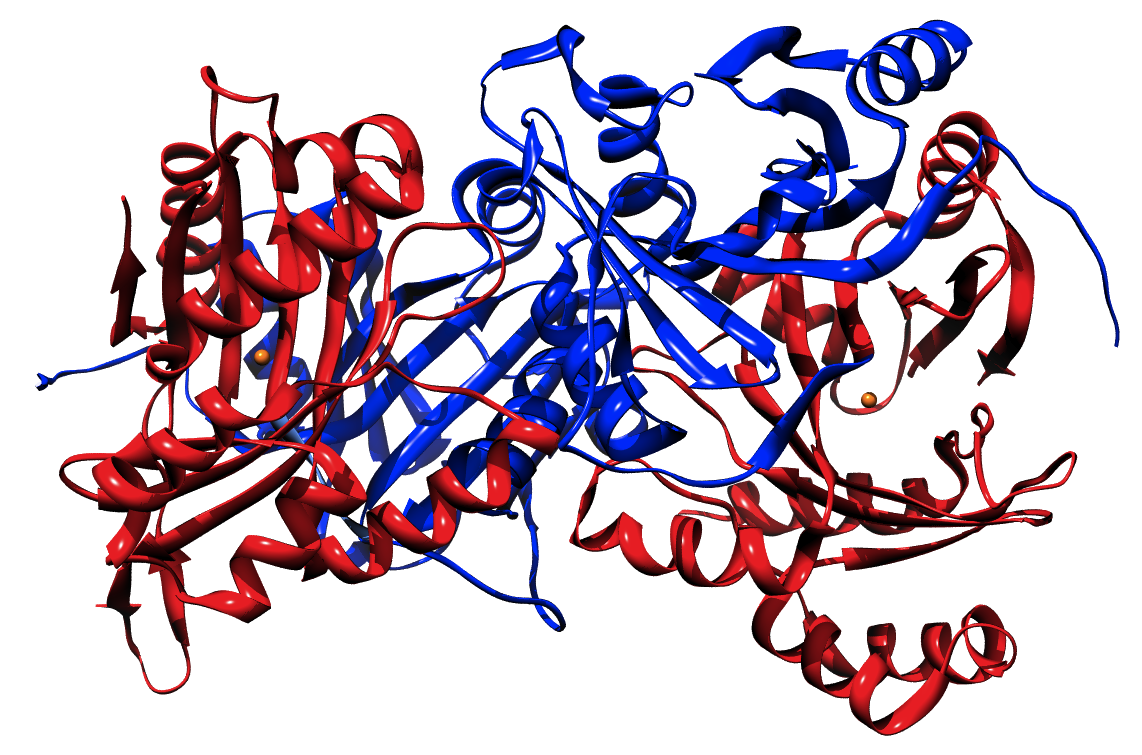
- Homodimer of 4-Hydroxyphenylpyruvate dioxygenase. Red ribbon represents iron-containing catalytic domain (with Fe 2+ represented as red-orange spheres); blue represents the oligomeric domain. Image generated from published structural data

Identifiers
- EC no.: 1.13.11.27
- CAS no.: 9029-72-5

Databases
- BRENDA: enzyme data
- ExPASy: NiceZyme view
- KEGG: enzyme entry
- MetaCyc: metabolic pathway
- Rhea: reactions
- PDB structures: RCSB PDB PDBe PDBsum
- Gene Ontology: AmiGO / QuickGO
Search
- PMC: articles
- PubMed: articles
- NCBI: proteins

HPD

Identifiers
- Aliases: HPD, 4-HPPD, 4HPPD, GLOD3, HPPDASE, PPD, 4-hydroxyphenylpyruvate dioxygenase
- External IDs: OMIM: 609695; MGI: 96213; GeneCards: HPD
Available structures
PDB	Ortholog search: PDBe RCSB
PDB	List of PDB id codes 3ISQ, 5EC3
Enzyme activity
EC #	BRENDA	ExPASy	KEGG	MetaCyc
1.13.11.27	↗	↗	↗	↗
2.1.1.348	↗	↗	↗	↗

Gene location (Human)
Chr.	Chromosome 12 (human)
Band	12q24.31	Start	121,839,527 bp
Band	12q24.31	End	121,863,596 bp

Gene location (Mouse)
Chr.	Chromosome 5 (mouse)
Band	5 F|5 62.82 cM	Start	123,309,870 bp
Band	5 F|5 62.82 cM	End	123,320,790 bp
RNA expression pattern
Bgee	Human / Mouse (ortholog); Top expressed in: right lobe of liver; kidney tubule; glomerulus; metanephric glomerulus; human kidney; gonad; thoracic aorta; ascending aorta; left uterine tube; Descending thoracic aorta / Top expressed in: left lobe of liver; crypt of lieberkuhn of small intestine; gallbladder; right kidney; superior surface of tongue; human kidney; right lobe of liver; proximal tubule; gastrula; Paneth cell; More reference expression data
BioGPS	n/a
Gene ontology
Molecular function	oxidoreductase activity; oxidoreductase activity, acting on single donors with incorporation of molecular oxygen; dioxygenase activity; metal ion binding; 4-hydroxyphenylpyruvate dioxygenase activity
Cellular component	cytosol; extracellular exosome; Golgi membrane; endoplasmic reticulum membrane
Biological process	aromatic amino acid family metabolic process; L-phenylalanine catabolic process; tyrosine catabolic process
Sources:Amigo / QuickGO
Orthologs
Databases	NCBI: entry; OMA: entry
Species	Human	Mouse
Entrez	3242	15445
Ensembl	ENSG00000158104	ENSMUSG00000029445
UniProt	P32754	P49429
RefSeq (mRNA)	NM_002150; NM_001171993	NM_008277
RefSeq (protein)	NP_001165464; NP_002141	NP_032303
Location (UCSC)	Chr 12: 121.84 – 121.86 Mb	Chr 5: 123.31 – 123.32 Mb
PubMed search
- Wikidata
View/Edit Human	View/Edit Mouse

4-Hydroxyphenylpyruvate dioxygenase (HPPD), also known as α-ketoisocaproate dioxygenase (KIC dioxygenase), is an Fe(II)-containing non-heme oxygenase that catalyzes the second reaction in the catabolism of tyrosine - the conversion of 4-hydroxyphenylpyruvate into homogentisate. HPPD also catalyzes the conversion of phenylpyruvate to 2-hydroxyphenylacetate and the conversion of α-ketoisocaproate to β-hydroxy β-methylbutyrate. HPPD is an enzyme that is found in nearly all aerobic forms of life.

This reaction shows the conversion of 4-hydroxyphenylpyruvate into homogentisate by HPPD.

== Enzyme mechanism ==
HPPD is categorized within a class of oxygenase enzymes that usually utilize α-ketoglutarate and diatomic oxygen to oxygenate or oxidize a target molecule. However, HPPD differs from most molecules in this class due to the fact that it does not use α-ketoglutarate, and it only utilizes two substrates while adding both atoms of diatomic oxygen into the product, homogentisate. The HPPD reaction occurs through a NIH shift and involves the oxidative decarboxylation of an α-oxo acid as well as aromatic ring hydroxylation. The NIH-shift, which has been demonstrated through isotope-labeling studies, involves migration of an alkyl group to form a more stable carbocation. The shift, accounts for the observation that C3 is bonded to C4 in 4-hydroxyphenylpyruvate but to C5 in homogentisate. The predicted mechanism of HPPD can be seen in the following figure:

Proposed Reaction Mechanism of HPPD

== Structure ==
HPPD is an enzyme that usually bonds to form tetramers in bacteria and dimers in eukaryotes and has a subunit mass of 40-50 kDa. Dividing the enzyme into the N-terminus and C-terminus one will notice that the N-terminus varies in composition while the C-terminus remains relatively constant (the C-terminus in plants does differ slightly from the C-terminus in other beings). In 1999 the first X-ray crystallography structure of HPPD was created and since then it has been discovered that the active site of HPPD is composed entirely of residues near the C-terminus of the enzyme. The active site of HPPD has not been completely mapped, but it is known that the site consists of an iron ion surrounded by amino acids extending inward from beta sheets (with the exception of the C-terminal helix). While even less is known about the function of the N-terminus of the enzyme, scientists have discovered that a single amino acid change in the N-terminal region can cause the disease known as hawkinsinuria.

== Function ==
In nearly all aerobic beings, 4-hydroxyphenylpyruvate dioxygenase is responsible for converting 4-hydroxyphenylpyruvate into homogentisate. This conversion is one of many steps in breaking L-tyrosine into acetoacetate and fumarate. While the overall products of this cycle are used to create energy, plants and higher order eukaryotes utilize HPPD for a much more important reason. In eukaryotes, HPPD is used to regulate blood tyrosine levels, and plants utilize this enzyme to help produce the cofactors plastoquinone and tocopherol which are essential for the plant to survive.

== Disease relevance ==
HPPD can be linked to one of the oldest known inherited metabolic disorders known as alkaptonuria, which is caused by high levels of homogentisate in the blood stream. HPPD is also directly linked to Type III tyrosinemia When the active HPPD enzyme concentration is low in the human body, it results in high levels of tyrosine concentration in the blood, which can cause mild intellectual disability at birth, and degradation in vision as a patient grows older.

In Type I tyrosinemia, a different enzyme, fumarylacetoacetate hydrolase is mutated and doesn't work, leading to very harmful products building up in the body. Fumarylacetoacetate hydrolase acts on tyrosine after HPPD does, so scientists working on making herbicides in the class of HPPD inhibitors hypothesized that inhibiting HPPD and controlling tyrosine in the diet could treat this disease. A series of small clinical trials were attempted with one of their compounds, nitisinone were conducted and were successful, leading to nitisinone being brought to market as an orphan drug.

== Role in Hematophagus Insects ==
In hepatophagous (blood-feeding) insects and arachnids, including mosquitoes, tsetse, ticks, kissing bugs, and bed bugs, HPPD plays a vital role in detoxifying excess tyrosine following a blood meal. Vertebrate blood is rich in proteins, particularly phenylalanine and tyrosine, which are rapidly broken down during digestion. The resulting surge in free tyrosine must be metabolised efficiently to prevent toxic accumulation.

HPPD is a critical enzyme in this pathway, converting 4-hydroxyphenylpyruvate into homogentisate. Inhibition of HPPD disrupts this process, leading to lethal tyrosine accumulation and oxidative stress. Experimental studies using HPPD inhibitors such as nitisinone have shown that these compounds induce rapid, bloodmeal-dependent mortality in a range of blood-feeding vector species. Lethality following HPPD inhibition has been observed regardless of resistance to conventional neurotoxic insecticides, making the pathway a conserved and exploitable metabolic vulnerability in vector control.

== Industrial relevance ==
Due to HPPD's role in producing necessary cofactors in plants, there are several marketed HPPD inhibitor herbicides that block activity of this enzyme, and research underway to find new ones. These herbicides make up Group 27 (AKA Group F2, or H in Australia) of the HRAC classification system.
