= Arogenate dehydratase =

Enzyme

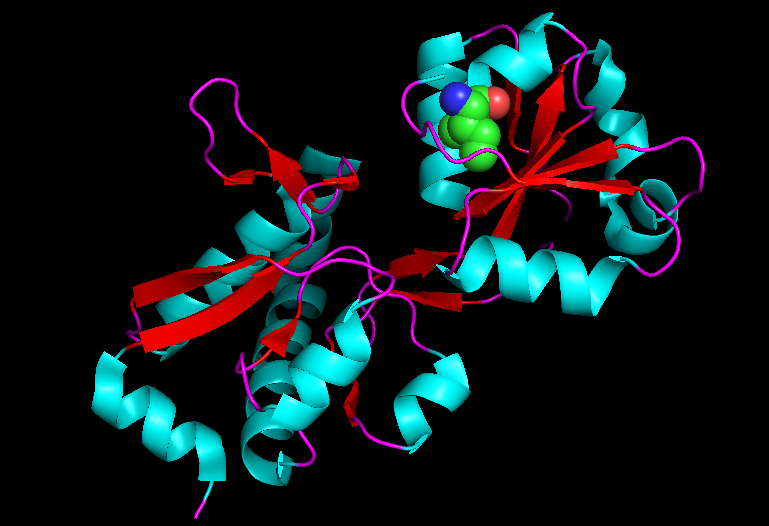
- The crystal structure of Cyclohexadienyl dehydratase precursor from Pseudomonas aeruginosa PA01. The secondary structure is displayed in the image, and the residue important for catalysis has been highlighted.

Identifiers
- EC no.: 4.2.1.91
- CAS no.: 76600-70-9

Databases
- IntEnz: IntEnz view
- BRENDA: BRENDA entry
- ExPASy: NiceZyme view
- KEGG: KEGG entry
- MetaCyc: metabolic pathway
- PRIAM: profile
- PDB structures: RCSB PDB PDBe PDBsum
Search
- PMC: articles
- PubMed: articles
- NCBI: proteins

Arogenate dehydratase (ADT) (EC 4.2.1.91) is an enzyme that catalyzes the chemical reaction

L-arogenate → L phenylalanine + H_{2}O + CO_{2}

Certain forms of the protein have the potential to catalyze a second reaction,

L-prephenate → L-phenylpyruvate + H_{2}O + CO_{2}

This enzyme participates in phenylalanine, tyrosine, and tryptophan biosynthesis (an example structure is shown to the right.

== Nomenclature ==
This enzyme belongs to the family of lyases, specifically the hydro-lyases, which cleave carbon-oxygen bonds. The systematic name of this enzyme class is L-arogenate hydro-lyase (decarboxylating; L-phenylalanine-forming). Other names in common use include:

- arogenate dehydratase
- L-arogenate hydro-lyase (decarboxylating)
- cyclohexadienyl dehydratase
- carbocyclohexadienyl dehydratase
- pheC
- ADT

== Reaction ==
The carboxyl and hydroxide groups (shown in red) attached to the 2,5-cyclohexene ring are eliminated from L-arogenate, leaving as carbon dioxide and water. The 2,5-cyclohexene ring becomes a phenyl ring, and L-phenylalanine is formed.

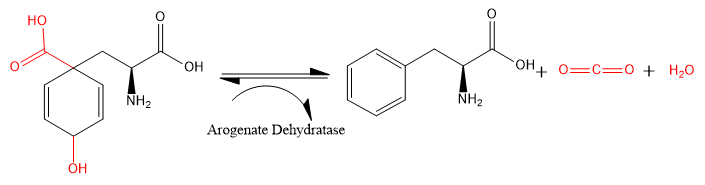
Arogenate dehydratase converting L-arogenate to L-phenylalanine, carbon dioxide, and water

Certain forms of ADT have been shown to exhibit some prephenate dehydratase (PDT) activity in addition to the standard ADT activity described above. Known as cyclohexadienyl dehydratases or carbocyclohexadienyl dehydratases (listed above), these forms of the enzyme catalyze the same type of reaction (a decarboxylation and a dehydration) on prephenate. The carboxyl and hydroxide groups (in red) attached to the 2,5-cyclohexene ring are removed, leaving phenylpyruvate.

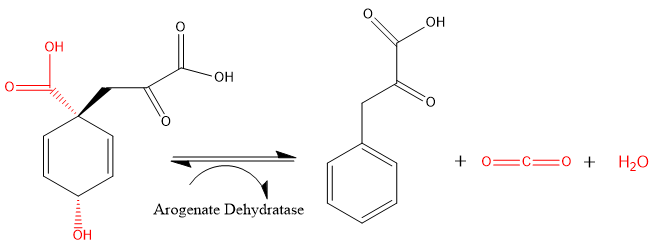
Arogenate dehydratase converting prephenate to phenylpyruvate, carbon dioxide and water

== Function ==
ADT catalyzes a reaction categorized by two major changes in the structure of the substrate, these being a decarboxylation and a dehydration; the enzyme removes a carboxyl group and a water molecule (respectively). Both potential products of this reaction (L-arogenate and phenylpyruvate) occur at or near the end of the biosynthetic pathway. Total synthesis of L-arogenate has been reported.

== Structure ==
The structure of arogenate dehydratases are described as having, for the most part, three major sections. ADTs contain an N-terminal transit peptide, a PDT-like domain, and an ACT (Aspartokinase, chorismate mutase, TyrA) domain.

== Homologues ==
Homologues for ADT have been isolated in Arabidopsis thaliana (rabbit-ear cress), Nicotiana sylvestris (tobacco), Spinacia oleracea (spinach), Petunia hybrida, Sorghum bicolor, Oryza sativa, and Pinus pinaster which are all considered higher-order plants. Erwinia herbicola and Pseudomonas aeruginosa are known to have homologues for cyclohexadienyl dehydratase. Of the plants with ADT homologues, both Arabidopsis thaliana, Petunia hybrida, and Pinus pinaster are known to have paralogues for the gene (six, three, and nine, respectively).
