= Prephenate dehydrogenase (NADP+) =

Class of enzymes

prephenate dehydrogenase (NADP+)

Identifiers
- EC no.: 1.3.1.13
- CAS no.: 37251-11-9

Databases
- IntEnz: IntEnz view
- BRENDA: BRENDA entry
- ExPASy: NiceZyme view
- KEGG: KEGG entry
- MetaCyc: metabolic pathway
- PRIAM: profile
- PDB structures: RCSB PDB PDBe PDBsum
- Gene Ontology: AmiGO / QuickGO
Search
- PMC: articles
- PubMed: articles
- NCBI: proteins

In enzymology, prephenate dehydrogenase (NADP+) (EC 1.3.1.13) is an enzyme that catalyzes the chemical reaction

Prephenic acid
+ NADP^{+}
CO_{2} + H^{+}
CO_{2} + H^{+}
4-Hydroxyphenylpyruvic acid
+ NADPH

The two substrates of this enzyme are prephenic acid and oxidised nicotinamide adenine dinucleotide phosphate (NADP^{+}). Its products are 4-hydroxyphenylpyruvic acid, carbon dioxide, reduced NADPH, and a proton.

This enzyme belongs to the family of oxidoreductases, specifically those acting on the CH-CH group of donor with NAD+ or NADP+ as acceptor. The systematic name of this enzyme class is prephenate:NADP+ oxidoreductase (decarboxylating). Other names in common use include prephenate dehydrogenase, prephenate (nicotinamide adenine dinucleotide phosphate), dehydrogenase, and prephenate dehydrogenase (NADP). This enzyme participates in phenylalanine, tyrosine and tryptophan biosynthesis.
