= 4-Hydroxyphenylacetate 3-monooxygenase =

Class of enzymes

4-hydroxyphenylacetate 3-monooxygenase
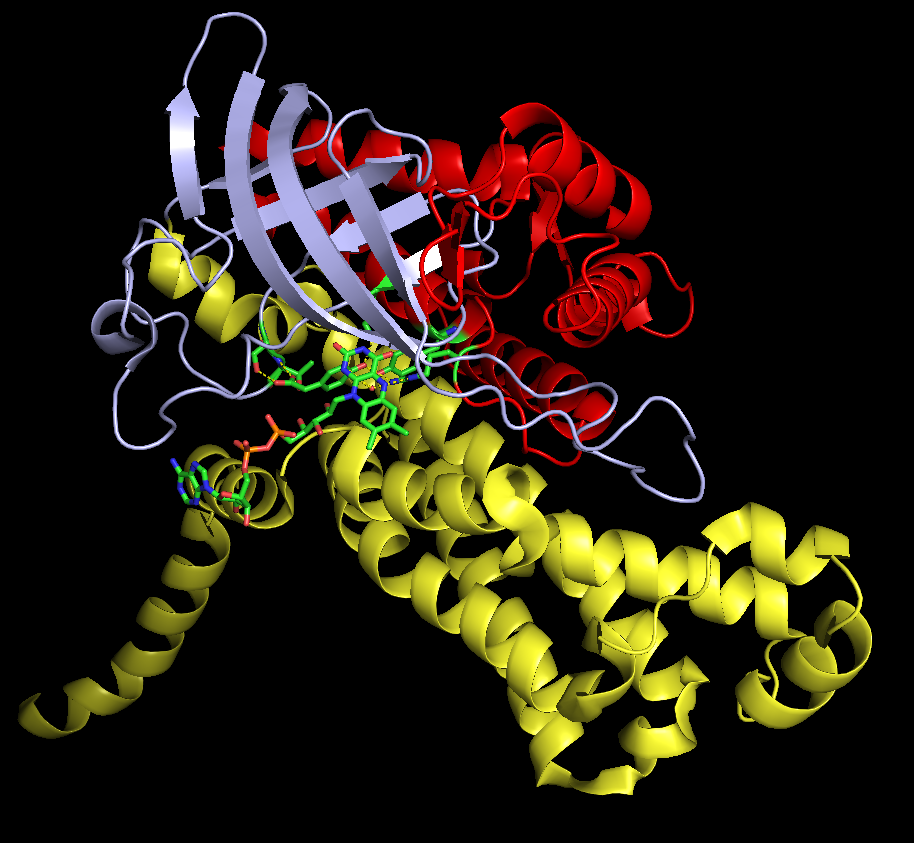
- PyMOL-generated cartoon of a Thermus thermophilus hpaB monomer complexed to FAD and 4-hydroxyphenylacetate. Color-coding distinguishes the enzyme's three primary structural domains.

Identifiers
- EC no.: 1.14.14.9
- CAS no.: 37256-71-6

Databases
- BRENDA: enzyme data
- ExPASy: NiceZyme view
- KEGG: enzyme entry
- MetaCyc: metabolic pathway
- Rhea: reactions
- PDB structures: RCSB PDB PDBe PDBsum
- Gene Ontology: AmiGO / QuickGO
Search
- PMC: articles
- PubMed: articles
- NCBI: proteins

4-hydroxyphenylacetate 3-monooxygenase (EC 1.14.14.9) is an enzyme that catalyzes the chemical reaction

4-Hydroxyphenylacetic acid
+ FADH_{2}
O_{2}
H_{2}O
3,4-Dihydroxyphenylacetic acid
+ FAD

This reaction is the first step in a pathway found in enteric bacteria such as Escherichia coli and soil bacteria such as Pseudomonas putida which degrades 4-hydroxyphenylacetate (4-HPA), allowing these bacteria to use 4-HPA and other aromatic compounds found in mammalian digestive tracts or in soil as a carbon source. While most known flavin monooxygenases use NADH or NADPH as substrates (and use the flavins FAD or FMN as prosthetic groups), this enzyme is part of a two-component system, in which a flavin oxidoreductase partner (EC 1.5.1.37) regenerates FADH_{2} by oxidizing NADH to NAD^{+}. hpaB and hpaC, the 4-HPA oxygenase and reductase partner proteins (respectively) of E. coli strain W, were the first two-component flavin monoxygenase system identified. While known examples of this enzyme share a common catalytic mechanism and likely evolutionary origin, they differ with respect to regulation and ability to substitute FMNH_{2} for FADH_{2} as a substrate.

== Structure ==
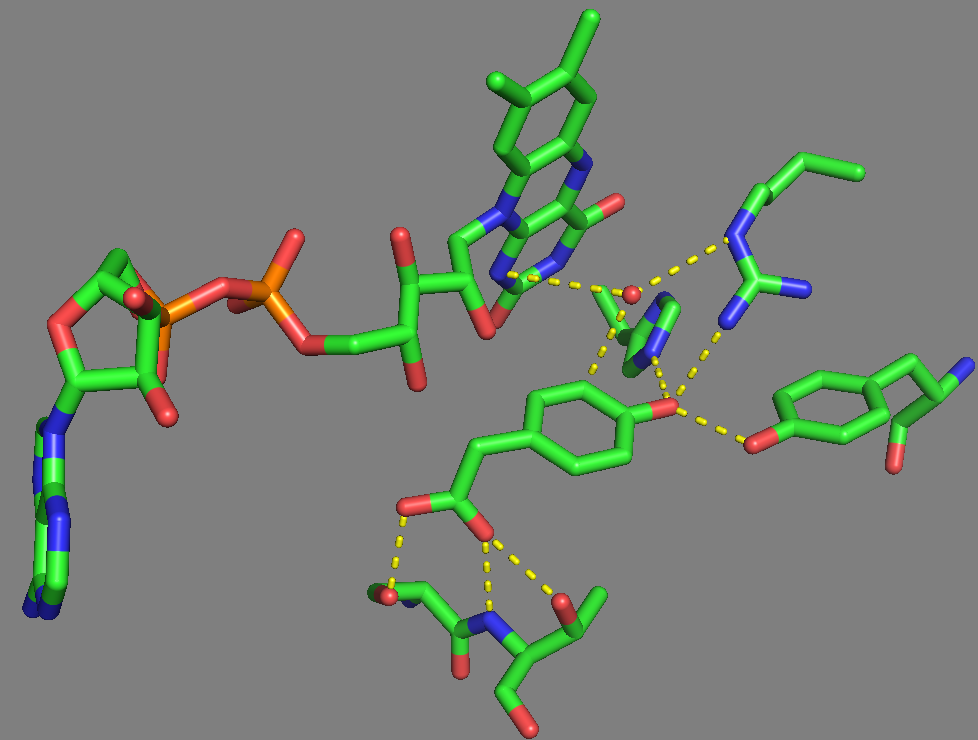
Active site of T. thermophilus hpaB, showing hydrogen bonding of hpaB catalytic residues to 4-hydroxyphenylacetate and to the peroxide bound to FADH_{2}. (Note: this structure was generated using oxidized FAD in place of FADH_{2}; the magenta sphere representing oxygen here is actually a water molecule believed to occupy the space oxygen does when the flavin hydroxyperoxide is present.)

This enzyme is a tetramer which forms as a dimer of dimers. Sequence alignments of the Thermus thermophilus and E. coli hpaB enzymes show structural similarity to each other and to the oxygenase components of other bacterial two-component monooxygenases for compounds such as phenol and chlorophenol. Each monomer of this protein consists of an N-terminal alpha-helical domain, a middle beta barrel domain, and a C-terminal "tail" helix. FADH_{2} is bound by a groove between these domains; this binding event causes a loop in the middle domain to change position, preforming a binding site for 4-HPA. At this point, multiple residues act to stabilize catalytic intermediates by hydrogen-bonding to the peroxide bound to FAD, as well as to the hydroxyl group of 4-HPA's phenol moiety (stabilizing its dienone transition state - see Mechanism). The loop which moves to form the 4-HPA binding site when FADH_{2} binds provides catalytic specificity by hydrogen-bonding to 4-HPA's carboxylic acid moiety.

== Mechanism ==
While many flavin-dependent monooxygenases retain FMN or FAD in their active sites throughout their catalytic cycle, this enzyme binds FADH_{2} at the start of its catalytic cycle and releases FAD at the end. After FADH_{2} binds, dioxygen attacks it at the C4a carbon, leading to a C4a-hydroperoxyflavin intermediate. 4-HPA then binds, and a conformational change sequesters the enzyme's active site from solution, preventing the oxygen from escaping as toxic hydrogen peroxide. 4-HPA is then hydroxylated via a dienone intermediate and released as 3,4-DHPA; with the peroxide bond broken, C4a-hydroxyflavin releases the remaining oxygen atom by eliminating water and is released from the enzyme as FAD.

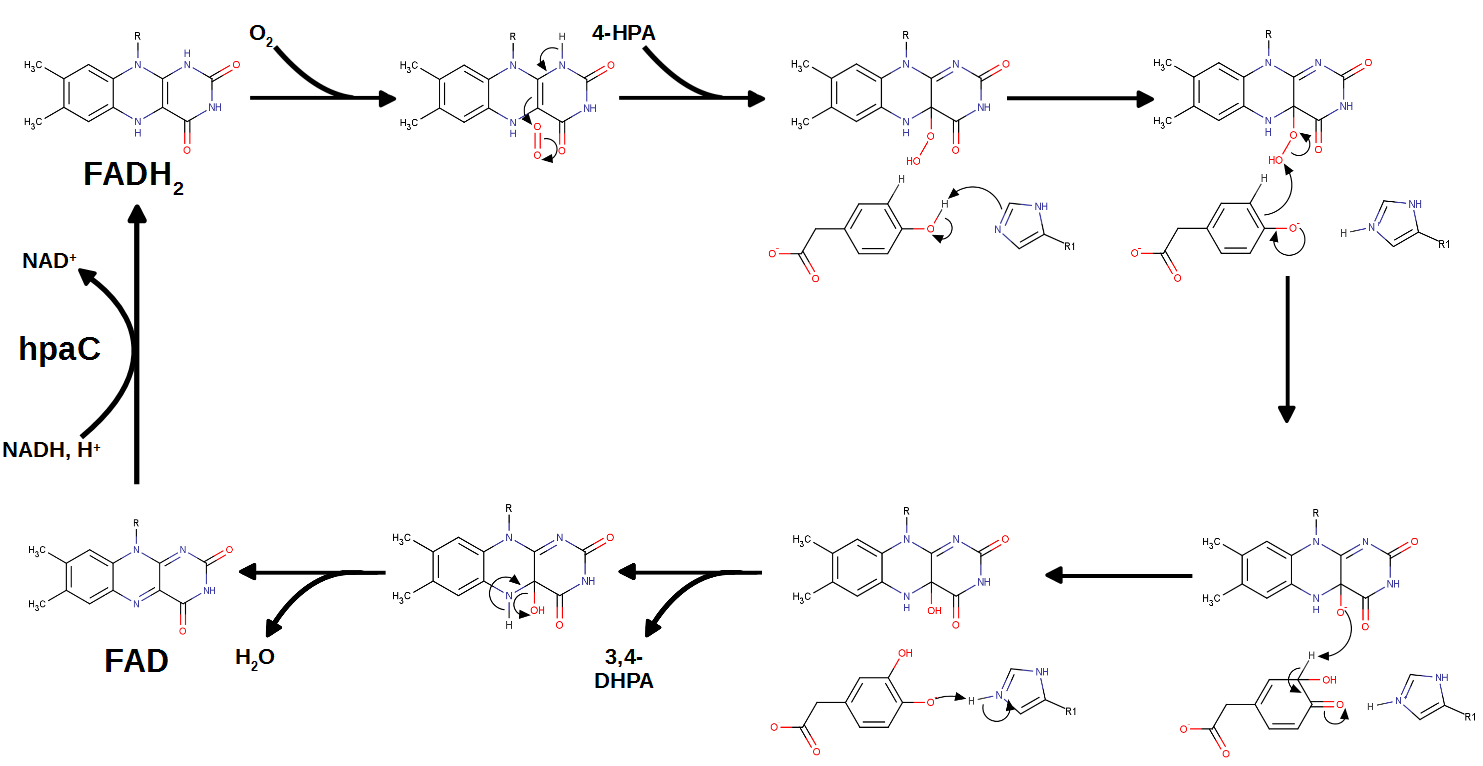
Catalytic cycle of the enzyme 4-hydroxyphenylacetate 3-monooxygenase, also showing FADH_{2} regeneration by flavin oxidoreductase partner (hpaC is E. coli nomenclature). The mechanism of 4-HPA deprotonation is simplified; multiple residues likely participate in the actual enzyme (see above).

== Biological Function ==
To cope with the wide variety of phenolic compounds found in nature, bacterial pathways for degradation of aromatic compounds generally begin by channeling these diverse substrates towards a few common intermediates, which are then further degraded. Pathways for catabolizing aromatic compounds generally begin by adding two hydroxyl groups to the benzene ring, most often on adjacent carbons. This product then undergoes ring cleavage to produce a linear molecule which is ultimately degraded to intermediates of central metabolism, such as succinate, pyruvate, and carbon dioxide. In the case of 4-hydroxyphenylacetate, which only needs one hydroxyl group to be added, a monooxygenase is required.

Among common E. coli laboratory strains, the 4-HPA degradation pathway is not found in the commonly used K-12 strain, but it does appear in strains B, C, and W (the strain in which most research into the pathway has been done). Only strains containing this pathway are able to survive by metabolizing 4-HPA as the sole carbon source, showing that this pathway is required for catabolism of this compound, and likely for similar phenolic compounds as well.

== Evolution ==
In addition to the exclusively FADH_{2}-dependent monooxygenase found in species such as E. coli and T. thermophilus, a version of the enzyme which can use either reduced FAD or reduced FMN has been described in Acinetobacter baumannii. Although these enzymes catalyze similar reactions and share a similar acyl-CoA dehydrogenase fold, the FMN-dependent enzyme is allosterically regulated by 4-HPA while the FADH_{2}-dependent enzyme is likely regulated by a simpler kinetic mechanism, in which low concentrations of 4-HPA lead the enzyme to bind and sequester FADH_{2} as part of the normal catalytic cycle, causing the free concentration of FADH_{2} to drop until the flavin oxidoreductase's reaction is indirectly inhibited as well. Along with other differences in regulation and substrate binding despite a shared fundamental catalytic mechanism, this has led to speculation that these enzymes collectively represent an example of convergent evolution.

== Potential Applications ==
In addition to 4-HPA, the enzyme has been reported to have activity on a number of other phenolic substrates. Metabolic engineers have demonstrated that microbes expressing the E. coli enzyme can catalyze reactions such as hydroxylation of tyrosine to L-dopa and hydroxylation of the pharmacologically interesting phenylpropanoids umbelliferone and resveratrol. However, these approaches are not currently used commercially.
