= Prephenate transaminase =

Prephenate transaminase may refer to:

- Glutamate—prephenate aminotransferase, an enzyme
- Aspartate—prephenate aminotransferase, an enzyme
