= Hydroxyphenylpyruvate synthase =

Hydroxyphenylpyruvate synthase may refer to:

- Prephenate dehydrogenase, an enzyme
- Chorismate mutase, an enzyme
