= Arogenic acid =

- Structure of L-Arogenate

Names
- IUPAC name 1-[(2S)-2-amino-2-carboxyethyl]-4-hydroxycyclohexa-2,5-diene-1-carboxylic acid
- Other names (1s,4s)-1-(2-Amino-2-carboxyethyl)-4-hydroxycyclohexa-2,5-diene-1-carboxylic acid

Identifiers
CAS Number	53078-86-7 (L)
3D model (JSmol)	Interactive image; Zwitterion: Interactive image
Beilstein Reference	4458841
ChEBI	CHEBI:17530
ChemSpider	28533971
KEGG	C00826
PubChem CID	25244469
UNII	OF8O7OR17T
- InChI: InChI=1S/C10H13NO5/c11-7(8(13)14)5-10(9(15)16)3-1-6(12)2-4-10/h1-4,6-7,12H,5,11H2,(H,13,14)(H,15,16)/p-1/t6?,7-,10?/m0/s1 Key: MIEILDYWGANZNH-DSQUFTABSA-M
- SMILES: C1=CC(C=CC1O)(CC(C(=O)[O-])N)C(=O)O; Zwitterion: C1=CC(C=CC1O)(CC(C(=O)[O-])[NH3+])C(=O)[O-]

Properties
Chemical formula	C_{10}H_{13}NO_{5}
Molar mass	227.216 g·mol^{−1}
- Except where otherwise noted, data are given for materials in their standard state (at 25 °C [77 °F], 100 kPa). Infobox references

Arogenic acid is an intermediate in the biosynthesis of phenylalanine and tyrosine. At physiological pH it exists as its conjugate base arogenate as the acid form is unstable.

== Metabolism ==
Arogenate is synthesized from prephenate by transamination. This reaction can be catalyzed by several enzymes, including aromatic-amino-acid transaminase, aspartate—prephenate aminotransferase and glutamate—prephenate aminotransferase:

prephenate + amino acid → arogenate + keto acid

The amino acid in this case can be either aspartate or glutamate, which turn into oxaloacetate and 2-oxoglutarate, respectively.

Arogenate is then turned into either phenylalanine or tyrosine. When prephenate dehydratase or arogenate dehydratase act upon arogenate, phenylalanine is produced:

arogenate → phenylalanine + H_{2}O + CO_{2}

When arogenate dehydrogenase, arogenate dehydrogenase (NAD(P)+) or arogenate dehydrogenase (NADP+) acts upon arogenate, tyrosine is produced:

L-arogenate
+ NAD^{+}
CO_{2}
CO_{2}
L-tyrosine
+ NADH
