= Prephenate dehydrogenase =

Class of enzymes

prephenate dehydrogenase
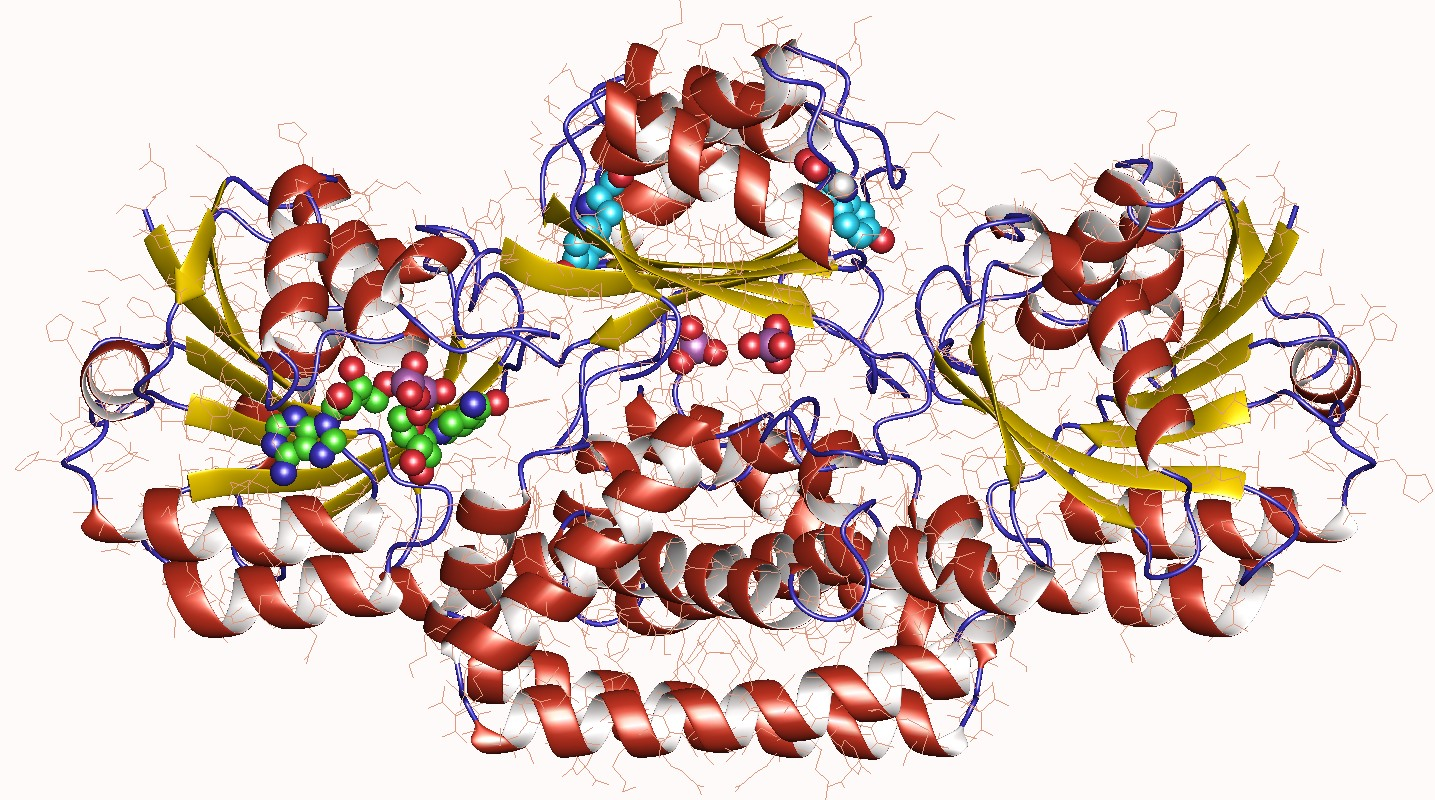
- Prephenate dehydrogenase homodimer, Bacillus anthracis

Identifiers
- EC no.: 1.3.1.12
- CAS no.: 9044-92-2

Databases
- IntEnz: IntEnz view
- BRENDA: BRENDA entry
- ExPASy: NiceZyme view
- KEGG: KEGG entry
- MetaCyc: metabolic pathway
- PRIAM: profile
- PDB structures: RCSB PDB PDBe PDBsum
- Gene Ontology: AmiGO / QuickGO
Search
- PMC: articles
- PubMed: articles
- NCBI: proteins

Prephenate dehydrogenase is an enzyme found in the shikimate pathway, and helps catalyze the reaction from prephenate to tyrosine.

== Nomenclature ==
Gene: (Saccharomyces Cerevisiae) TYR1

Shikimate pathway: Arogenate/Prephenate (ADH/PDH). Although in the shikimate pathway arogenate and prephenate dehydrogenase catalyze different reactions, they can at times be used interchangeably.

- TyrA (tyrosine A: within the tyrosine pathway)
- Prephenate dehydrogenase
- Prephenate (Nicotinamide adenine dinucleotide phosphate) dehydrogenase
- Prephenate dehydrogenase (NADP)
- NADP+ oxidoreductase

== Homology ==
This enzyme so far has been found in sixteen different organisms; twelve different kinds of bacteria (mostly cyanobacteria) and four different kinds of plants (mostly different kinds of beans).

Bacteria organisms (examples): Acenitobacter calcoaceticus, Fischerella sp., Flavobacterium so., Comamonas testosteroni, and nostoc sp.

Plant organisms: phaseolus coccineus, phaseolus vulgaris, vicia faba, vigna radiata

== Function ==
Present in the shikimate pathway, in the pathway to synthesize tyrosine (a non-essential amino acid in both bacteria and plants). It catalyzes the oxidative decarboxylation reaction of prephenate to 4-hydroxyphenylpyruvate.

== Reaction ==
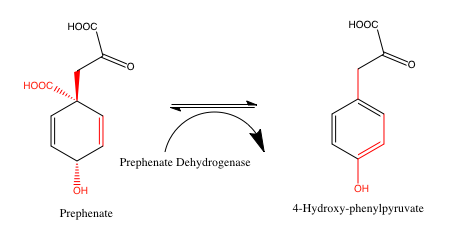
Prephenate dehydrogenase catalysis

In enzymology, a prephenate dehydrogenase (EC 1.3.1.12) is an enzyme that catalyzes the chemical reaction

prephenate + NAD^{+} $\rightleftharpoons$ 4-hydroxyphenylpyruvate + CO_{2} + NADH

Thus, the two substrates of this enzyme are prephenate and NAD^{+}, whereas its 3 products are 4-hydroxyphenylpyruvate, CO_{2}, and NADH.

== Structure ==
This enzyme belongs to the family of oxidoreductases, specifically those acting on the CH-CH group of donor with NAD+ or NADP+ as acceptor. The systematic name of this enzyme class is prephenate:NAD+ oxidoreductase (decarboxylating). Other names in common use include hydroxyphenylpyruvate synthase, and chorismate mutase---prephenate dehydrogenase. This enzyme participates in phenylalanine, tyrosine and tryptophan biosynthesis and novobiocin biosynthesis.

Also found in haemophilus influenzae, synechocystis (bacteria), and aquifex aeolicus (plant).

However, in haemophilus influenzae, prephenate dehydrogenase is fused with the enzyme chorismate mutase. This fusion is not found in plants or animals.

== Structural studies ==
As of late 2007, two structures have been solved for this class of enzymes, with PDB accession codes 2G5C and 2PV7.
