= 4-hydroxyphenylpyruvate oxidase =

Class of enzymes

Identifiers
- EC no.: 1.2.3.13

Databases
- IntEnz: IntEnz view
- BRENDA: BRENDA entry
- ExPASy: NiceZyme view
- KEGG: KEGG entry
- MetaCyc: metabolic pathway
- PRIAM: profile
- PDB structures: RCSB PDB PDBe PDBsum
- Gene Ontology: AmiGO / QuickGO
Search
- PMC: articles
- PubMed: articles
- NCBI: proteins

In enzymology, a 4-hydroxyphenylpyruvate oxidase (EC 1.2.3.13) is an enzyme that catalyzes the chemical reaction

4-hydroxyphenylpyruvate + 1/2 O_{2} $\rightleftharpoons$ 4-hydroxyphenylacetate + CO_{2}

Thus, the two substrates of this enzyme are 4-hydroxyphenylpyruvate and O_{2}, whereas its two products are 4-hydroxyphenylacetate and CO_{2}.

This enzyme belongs to the family of oxidoreductases, specifically those acting on the aldehyde or oxo group of donor with oxygen as acceptor. The systematic name of this enzyme class is 4-hydroxyphenylpyruvate:oxygen oxidoreductase (decarboxylating). This enzyme participates in tyrosine metabolism.
