= 1,5-anhydro-D-fructose dehydratase =

Class of enzymes

Identifiers
- EC no.: 4.2.1.111

Databases
- IntEnz: IntEnz view
- BRENDA: BRENDA entry
- ExPASy: NiceZyme view
- KEGG: KEGG entry
- MetaCyc: metabolic pathway
- PRIAM: profile
- PDB structures: RCSB PDB PDBe PDBsum
Search
- PMC: articles
- PubMed: articles
- NCBI: proteins

The enzyme 1,5-anhydro-D-fructose dehydratase (EC 4.2.1.111) catalyzes the chemical reaction

1,5-anhydro-D-fructose $\rightleftharpoons$ 1,5-anhydro-4-deoxy-D-glycero-hex-3-en-2-ulose + H_{2}O

It catalyzes two steps in the anhydrofructose pathway process.

This enzyme belongs to the family of lyases, specifically the hydro-lyases, which cleave carbon-oxygen bonds. The systematic name of this enzyme class is 1,5-anhydro-D-fructose hydro-lyase (ascopyrone-M-forming). Other names in common use include 1,5-anhydro-D-fructose 4-dehydratase, 1,5-anhydro-D-fructose hydrolyase, 1,5-anhydro-D-arabino-hex-2-ulose dehydratase, AFDH, AF dehydratase, and 1,5-anhydro-D-fructose hydro-lyase.

== See also ==
- Anhydrofructose pathway
- Ascopyrone tautomerase
- exo-(1→4)-α-D-glucan lyase
