= ACT domain =

Self-stabilizing region of a metabolic protein

ACT
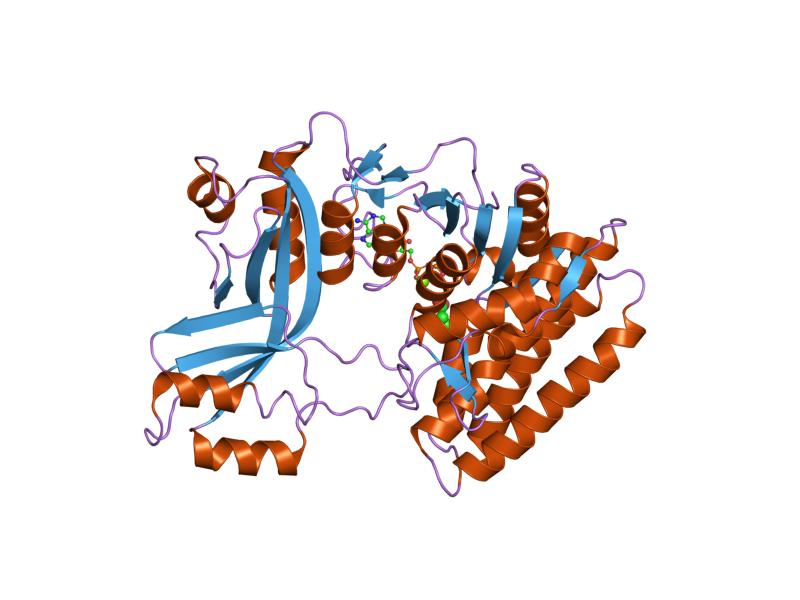
- Crystal structure of E. coli aspartokinase iii in complex with aspartate and adp (r-state)

Identifiers
- Symbol: ACT
- Pfam: PF01842
- Pfam clan: CL0070
- InterPro: IPR002912
- SCOP2: 1psd / SCOPe / SUPFAM
- CDD: cd02116
Available protein structures:
- Pfam: structures / ECOD
- PDB: RCSB PDB; PDBe; PDBj
- PDBsum: structure summary

In molecular biology, the ACT domain is a protein domain that is found in a variety of proteins involved in metabolism. ACT domains are linked to a wide range of metabolic enzymes that are regulated by amino acid concentration. The ACT domain is named after three of the proteins that contain it: aspartate kinase, chorismate mutase and TyrA. The archetypical ACT domain is the C-terminal regulatory domain of 3-phosphoglycerate dehydrogenase (3PGDH), which folds with a ferredoxin-like topology. A pair of ACT domains form an eight-stranded antiparallel sheet with two molecules of allosteric inhibitor serine bound in the interface. Biochemical exploration of a few other proteins containing ACT domains supports the suggestions that these domains contain the archetypical ACT structure.

The ACT domain was discovered by Aravind and Koonin using iterative sequence searches.
