= 4-hydroxyphenylacetate 1-monooxygenase =

Class of enzymes

Identifiers
- EC no.: 1.14.13.18
- CAS no.: 55326-44-8

Databases
- BRENDA: enzyme data
- ExPASy: NiceZyme view
- KEGG: enzyme entry
- MetaCyc: metabolic pathway
- Rhea: reactions
- PDB structures: RCSB PDB PDBe PDBsum
- Gene Ontology: AmiGO / QuickGO
Search
- PMC: articles
- PubMed: articles
- NCBI: proteins

4-hydroxyphenylacetate 1-monooxygenase (EC 1.14.13.18) is an enzyme that catalyzes the chemical reaction

4-Hydroxyphenylacetic acid
+ NADH + H^{+}
O_{2}
H_{2}O
Homogentisic acid
+ NAD^{+}

The four substrates of this enzyme are 4-hydroxyphenylacetic acid, reduced nicotinamide adenine dinucleotide (NADH), oxygen and a proton. Its products are homogentisic acid, oxidised NAD^{+}, and water. The enzyme can use nicotinamide adenine dinucleotide phosphate as an alternative cofactor.

The enzyme is a flavin-containing monooxygenase that uses molecular oxygen as oxidant and incorporates one of its atoms into the starting material. The systematic name of this enzyme class is 4-hydroxyphenylacetate,NAD(P)H:oxygen oxidoreductase (1-hydroxylating). Other names in common use include 4-hydroxyphenylacetate 1-hydroxylase, 4-hydroxyphenylacetic 1-hydroxylase, and 4-HPA 1-hydroxylase. This enzyme participates in tyrosine metabolism.
