= 4-hydroxymandelate synthase =

Class of enzymes

Identifiers
- EC no.: 1.13.11.46

Databases
- IntEnz: IntEnz view
- BRENDA: BRENDA entry
- ExPASy: NiceZyme view
- KEGG: KEGG entry
- MetaCyc: metabolic pathway
- PRIAM: profile
- PDB structures: RCSB PDB PDBe PDBsum
- Gene Ontology: AmiGO / QuickGO
Search
- PMC: articles
- PubMed: articles
- NCBI: proteins

4-hydroxymandelate synthase (EC 1.13.11.46) is an enzyme that catalyzes the chemical reaction

4-Hydroxyphenylpyruvic acid
O_{2}
CO_{2}
(S)-4-hydroxymandelic acid

The two substrates of this enzyme are 4-hydroxyphenylpyruvic acid and oxygen. Its products are (S)-4-hydroxymandelic acid and carbon dioxide.

This enzyme belongs to the family of oxidoreductases, specifically those acting on single donors with O_{2} as oxidant and incorporation of two atoms of oxygen into the substrate (oxygenases). The oxygen incorporated need not be derived from O_{2}. The systematic name of this enzyme class is 4-hydroxyphenylpyruvate:oxygen oxidoreductase (decarboxylating). This enzyme is also called 4-hydroxyphenylpyruvate dioxygenase II.
