= Mandelate 4-monooxygenase =

Class of enzymes

Identifiers
- EC no.: 1.14.16.6
- CAS no.: 39459-82-0

Databases
- IntEnz: IntEnz view
- BRENDA: BRENDA entry
- ExPASy: NiceZyme view
- KEGG: KEGG entry
- MetaCyc: metabolic pathway
- PRIAM: profile
- PDB structures: RCSB PDB PDBe PDBsum
- Gene Ontology: AmiGO / QuickGO
Search
- PMC: articles
- PubMed: articles
- NCBI: proteins

Mandelate 4-monooxygenase (EC 1.14.16.6) is an enzyme that catalyzes the chemical reaction

(S)-mandelic acid
+
tetrahydro-biopterin
O_{2}
H_{2}O
(S)-4-hydroxymandelic acid
+
dihydrobiopterin

The three substrates of this enzyme are (S)-mandelic acid, tetrahydrobiopterin, and oxygen. Its products are (S)-4-hydroxymandelic acid, dihydrobiopterin, and water.

This enzyme characterised from Pseudomonas convexa is an oxidoreductase that uses molecular oxygen as oxidant. A reduced pteridine is required. The systematic name of this enzyme class is (S)-2-hydroxy-2-phenylacetate,tetrahydrobiopterin:oxygen oxidoreductase (4-hydroxylating). Other names in common use include L-mandelate 4-hydroxylase, and mandelic acid 4-hydroxylase. It employs one cofactor, iron.
