= 4-chlorophenylacetate 3,4-dioxygenase =

Class of enzymes

Identifiers
- EC no.: 1.14.12.9
- CAS no.: 105006-00-6

Databases
- IntEnz: IntEnz view
- BRENDA: BRENDA entry
- ExPASy: NiceZyme view
- KEGG: KEGG entry
- MetaCyc: metabolic pathway
- PRIAM: profile
- PDB structures: RCSB PDB PDBe PDBsum
- Gene Ontology: AmiGO / QuickGO
Search
- PMC: articles
- PubMed: articles
- NCBI: proteins

4-chlorophenylacetate 3,4-dioxygenase (EC 1.14.12.9) is an enzyme that catalyzes the chemical reaction

4-Chlorophenylacetic acid
+ NADH
O_{2} + H^{+}
3,4-Dihydroxyphenylacetic acid
+ NAD^{+} + HCl

The four substrates of this enzyme are 4-chlorophenylacetic acid, reduced nicotinamide adenine dinucleotide (NADH), oxygen, and a proton. Its products are 3,4-dihydroxyphenylacetic acid, oxidised NAD^{+}, and hydrochloric acid.

This enzyme is an oxidoreductase, which uses molecular oxygen as oxidant and incorporates both its atoms into the starting material. The systematic name of the enzyme class is 4-chlorophenylacetate,NADH:oxygen oxidoreductase (3,4-hydroxylating, dechlorinating). It is an iron–sulfur protein that is part of tyrosine metabolism.
