= 4-hydroxyphenylacetate decarboxylase =

Class of enzymes

Identifiers
- EC no.: 4.1.1.83

Databases
- BRENDA: enzyme data
- ExPASy: NiceZyme view
- KEGG: enzyme entry
- MetaCyc: metabolic pathway
- Rhea: reactions
- PDB structures: RCSB PDB PDBe PDBsum
- Gene Ontology: AmiGO / QuickGO
Search
- PMC: articles
- PubMed: articles
- NCBI: proteins

The enzyme 4-hydroxyphenylacetate decarboxylase (EC 4.1.1.83), characterised from Clostridium difficile, catalyzes the decarboxylation of 4-hydroxyphenylacetic acid to p-cresol and carbon dioxide:

4-hydroxyphenylacetic acid
CO_{2}
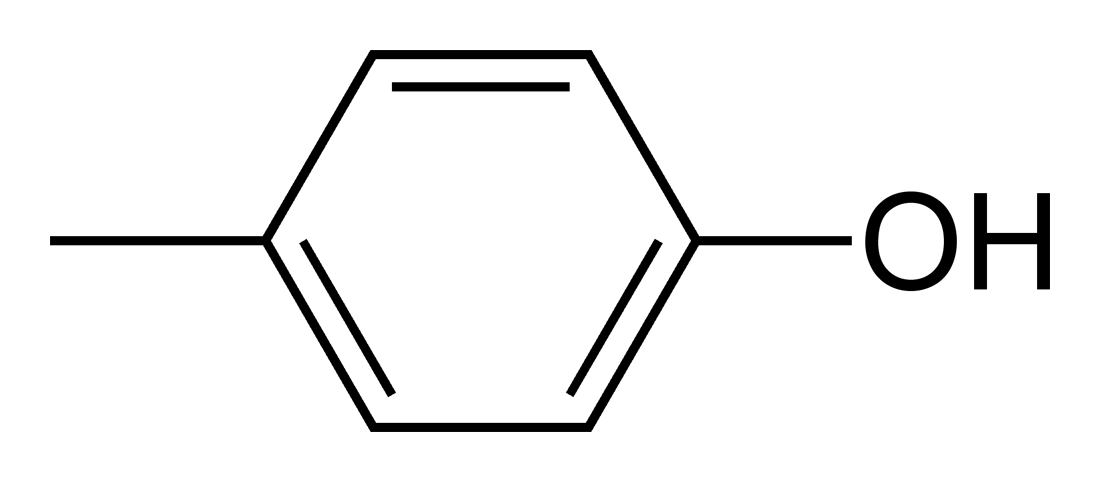
p-cresol

The enzyme contains an iron–sulfur cluster and the mechanism of reaction involves a glycyl radical generated from S-adenosyl methionine.

This enzyme is a lyase, specifically a carboxy-lyase, which cleave carbon-carbon bonds. The systematic name of this enzyme class is 4-(hydroxyphenyl)acetate carboxy-lyase (4-methylphenol-forming). Other names in use include p-hydroxyphenylacetate decarboxylase, p-Hpd, 4-Hpd, and 4-hydroxyphenylacetate carboxy-lyase.
