= Cathepsin T =

Identifiers
- EC no.: 3.4.22.24
- CAS no.: 77464-86-9

Databases
- BRENDA: enzyme data
- ExPASy: NiceZyme view
- KEGG: enzyme entry
- MetaCyc: metabolic pathway
- Rhea: reactions
- PDB structures: RCSB PDB PDBe PDBsum
Search
- PMC: articles
- PubMed: articles
- NCBI: proteins

Cathepsin T (EC 3.4.22.24) is an enzyme. This enzyme catalyses the following chemical reaction: Interconversion of the three forms of tyrosine aminotransferase, EC 2.6.1.5.

This enzyme degrades azocasein and denatured hemoglobin.

== See also ==
- Cathepsin
