= Aspartate—prephenate aminotransferase =

Aspartate-prephenate aminotransferase

Identifiers
- EC no.: 2.6.1.78

Databases
- IntEnz: IntEnz view
- BRENDA: BRENDA entry
- ExPASy: NiceZyme view
- KEGG: KEGG entry
- MetaCyc: metabolic pathway
- PRIAM: profile
- PDB structures: RCSB PDB PDBe PDBsum
Search
- PMC: articles
- PubMed: articles
- NCBI: proteins

In enzymology, aspartate-prephenate aminotransferase (EC 2.6.1.78) is an enzyme that catalyzes the chemical reaction

L-arogenate
+
oxaloacetic acid
prephenic acid
+
aspartic acid

The two substrates of this enzyme are L-arogenic acid (shown in its carboxylate form) and oxaloacetic acid. Its products are prephenic acid and L-aspartic acid.

This enzyme belongs to the family of transferases, specifically the transaminases, which transfer nitrogenous groups. The systematic name of this enzyme class is L-arogenate:oxaloacetate aminotransferase. Other names in common use include prephenate transaminase (ambiguous), PAT (ambiguous), prephenate aspartate aminotransferase, and L-aspartate:prephenate aminotransferase.
