= Tyrosinemia type II =

- Other names: Oculocutaneous tyrosinemia, Richner-Hanhart syndrome
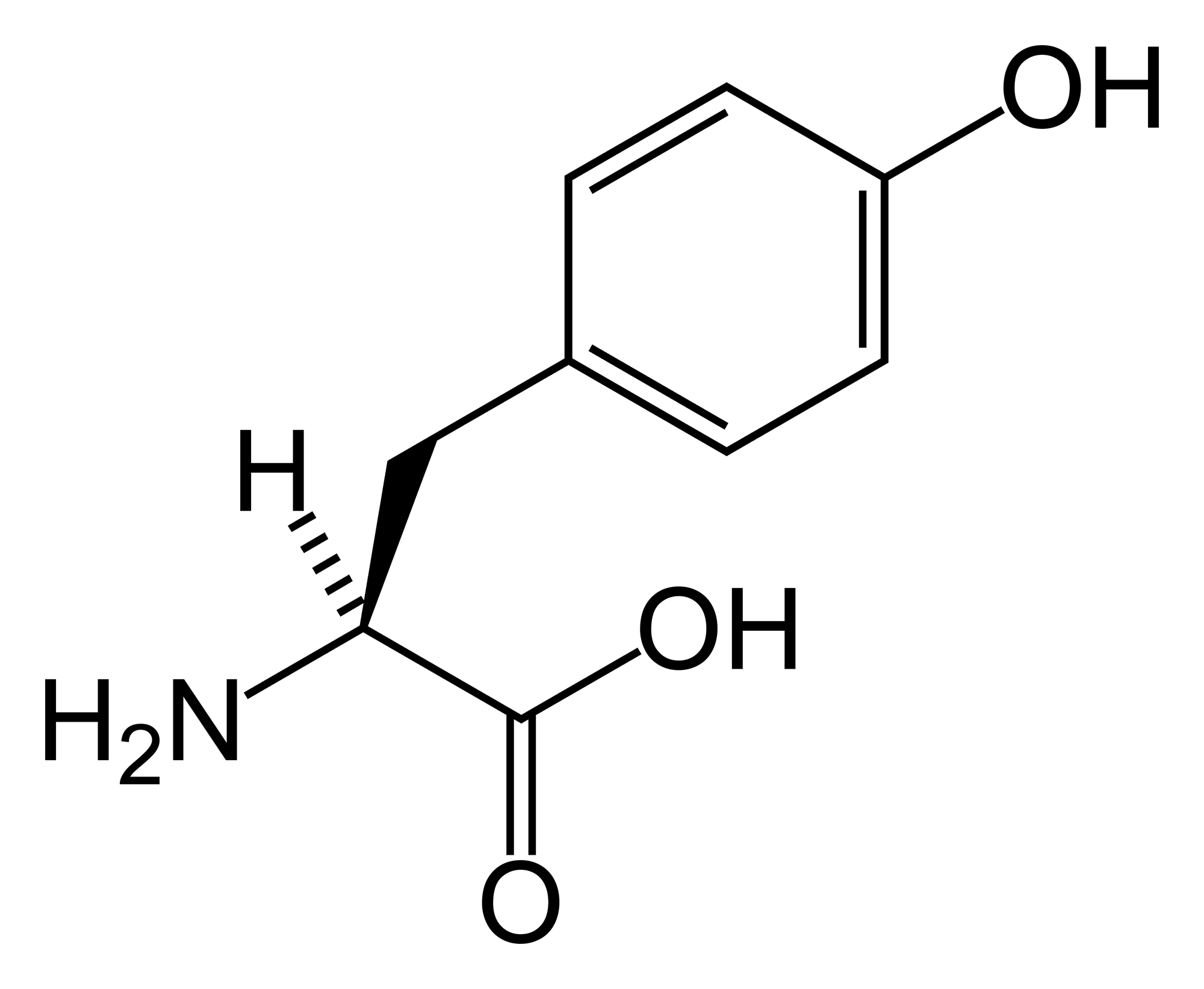
- Tyrosine
- Specialty: Dermatology
- Symptoms: Palmar hyperkeratosis, Plantar Hyperkeratosis, hyperhidrosis, corneal opacity, corneal ulcers.
- Causes: Genetic (autosomal recessive)

Tyrosinemia type II is an autosomal recessive condition with onset between ages 2 and 4 years, when painful circumscribed calluses develop on the pressure points of the palm of the hand and sole of the foot.

== Presentation ==
Palmar hyperkeratosis, Plantar Hyperkeratosis, hyperhidrosis, corneal opacity, corneal ulcers.

== Pathophysiology ==
Type II tyrosinemia is caused by a deficiency of the enzyme tyrosine aminotransferase (EC 2.6.1.5), encoded by the gene TAT. Tyrosine aminotransferase is the first in a series of five enzymes that converts tyrosine to smaller molecules, which are excreted by the kidneys or used in reactions that produce energy. This form of the disorder can affect the eyes, skin, and mental development. Symptoms often begin in early childhood and include excessive tearing, abnormal sensitivity to light (photophobia), eye pain and redness, and painful skin lesions on the palms and soles. About half of individuals with type II tyrosinemia are also mentally disabled. Type II tyrosinemia occurs in fewer than 1 in 250,000 individuals.

Pathophysiology of metabolic disorders of tyrosine, resulting in elevated levels of tyrosine in blood.

== Diagnosis ==
Diagnosis is made based on elevated plasma tyrosine level with skin or eye lesions.

== Treatment ==
Dietary restrictions of phenylalanine and tyrosine.

== See also ==
- Palmoplantar keratoderma
- List of cutaneous conditions
