= 4-Hydroxymandelic acid =

- Chemical structure of 4-Hydroxymandelic acid

Names
- Preferred IUPAC name Hydroxy(4-hydroxyphenyl)acetic acid
- Other names 2-Hydroxy-2-(4-hydroxyphenyl)acetic acid 4-Hydroxyphenylglycolic acid p-Hydroxymandelic acid 4-Hydroxymandelate

Identifiers
CAS Number	1198-84-1; 184901-84-6 (hydrate)
3D model (JSmol)	Interactive image
Beilstein Reference	2365374
ChemSpider	321
ECHA InfoCard	100.013.490
EC Number	214-839-7
PubChem CID	328
UNII	HV52GS53BA
CompTox Dashboard (EPA)	DTXSID70862596
- InChI: InChI=1S/C8H8O3/c9-7-3-1-6(2-4-7)5-8(10)11/h1-4,9H,5H2,(H,10,11) Key: YHXHKYRQLYQUIH-UHFFFAOYSA-N
- SMILES: C1=CC(=CC=C1C(C(=O)O)O)O

Properties
Chemical formula	C_{8}H_{8}O_{4}
Molar mass	168.148 g·mol^{−1}
Appearance	Light red powder
Melting point	89 °C (192 °F; 362 K)

Hazards
Safety data sheet (SDS)	MSDS at Sigma Aldrich
- Except where otherwise noted, data are given for materials in their standard state (at 25 °C [77 °F], 100 kPa). Infobox references

4-Hydroxymandelic acid is a chemical compound used to synthesize atenolol. The compound typically occurs as a monohydrate.

== Synthesis and occurrence ==
It is produced from 4-hydroxyphenylpyruvic acid by the action of the enzyme (S)-p-hydroxymandelate synthase:

HOC_{6}H_{4}CH_{2}C(O)CO_{2}H + O_{2} → HOC_{6}H_{4}CH(OH)CO_{2}H + CO2

4-Hydroxymandelic acid can be synthesized by the condensation reaction of phenol and glyoxylic acid:

HOC_{6}H_{5} + CHOCO_{2}H → HOC_{6}H_{4}CH(OH)CO_{2}H

== See also ==
- Vanillyl mandelic acid
- 4-Hydroxyphenylacetic acid
