= Arogenate dehydrogenase (NAD(P)+) =

Class of enzymes

Identifiers
- EC no.: 1.3.1.79
- CAS no.: 64295-75-6

Databases
- IntEnz: IntEnz view
- BRENDA: BRENDA entry
- ExPASy: NiceZyme view
- KEGG: KEGG entry
- MetaCyc: metabolic pathway
- PRIAM: profile
- PDB structures: RCSB PDB PDBe PDBsum
Search
- PMC: articles
- PubMed: articles
- NCBI: proteins

In enzymology, arogenate dehydrogenase [NAD(P)+] (EC 1.3.1.79) is an enzyme that catalyzes the chemical reaction

L-arogenate
+ NAD^{+}
CO_{2}
CO_{2}
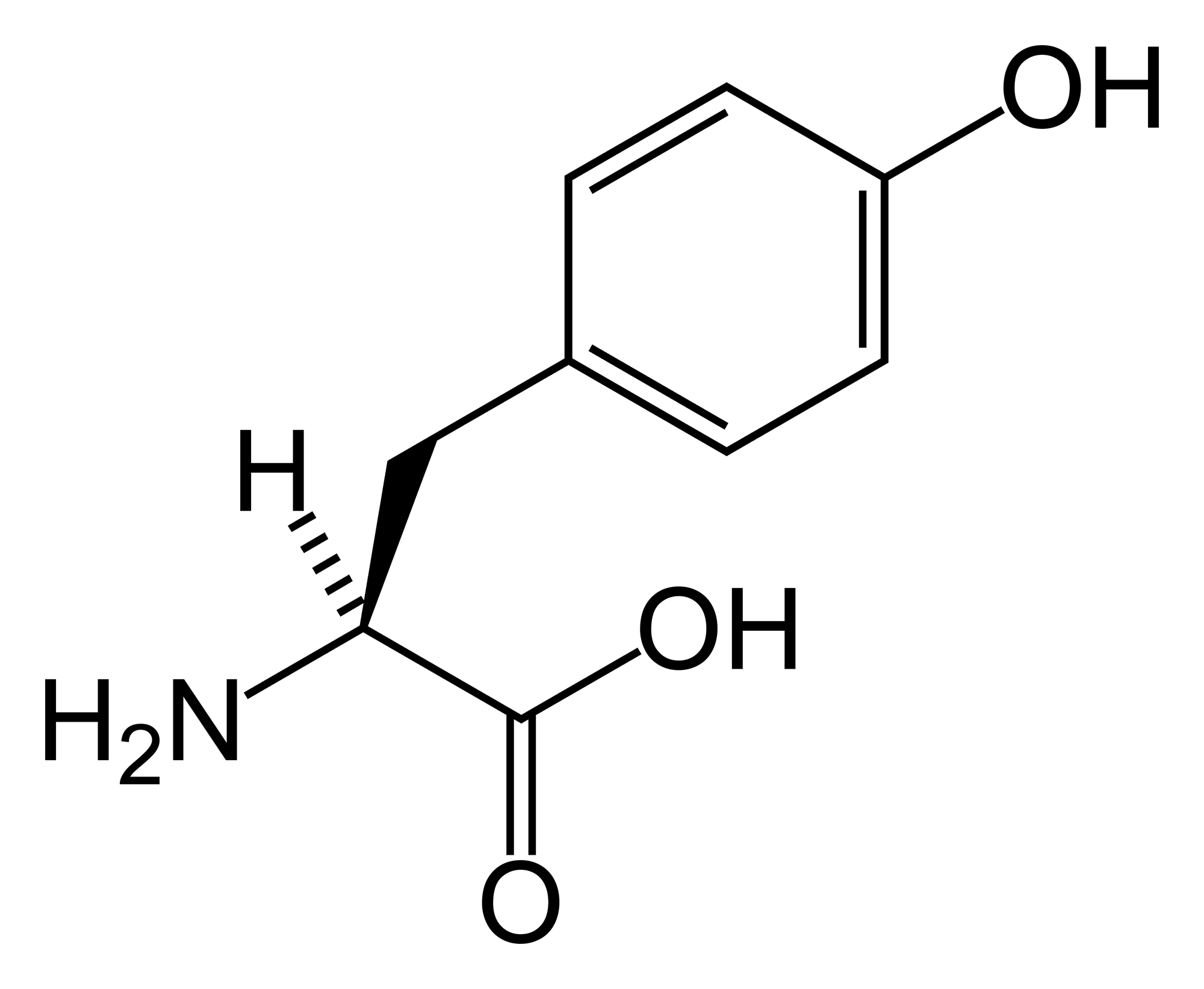
L-tyrosine
+ NADH

The two substrates of this enzyme are L-arogenic acid (shown as its conjugate base arogenate) and oxidised nicotinamide adenine dinucleotide (NAD^{+}). Its products are L-tyrosine, reduced NADH, and carbon dioxide. Nicotinamide adenine dinucleotide phosphate can be used as an alternative cofactor.

This enzyme belongs to the family of oxidoreductases, specifically those acting on the CH-CH group of donor with NAD+ or NADP+ as acceptor. The systematic name of this enzyme class is L-arogenate:NAD(P)+ oxidoreductase (decarboxylating). Other names in common use include arogenic dehydrogenase (ambiguous), cyclohexadienyl dehydrogenase, and pretyrosine dehydrogenase (ambiguous).
