= C10H10O6 =

The molecular formula C_{10}H_{10}O_{6} (molar mass: 226.18 g/mol, exact mass: 226.0477 u) may refer to:

- Chorismic acid
- Isochorismic acid
- Prephenic acid
