= Ascopyrone tautomerase =

Identifiers
- EC no.: 5.3.2.7

Databases
- IntEnz: IntEnz view
- BRENDA: BRENDA entry
- ExPASy: NiceZyme view
- KEGG: KEGG entry
- MetaCyc: metabolic pathway
- PRIAM: profile
- PDB structures: RCSB PDB PDBe PDBsum
Search
- PMC: articles
- PubMed: articles
- NCBI: proteins

In enzymology, an ascopyrone tautomerase (EC 5.3.2.7) is an enzyme that catalyzes the chemical reaction

1,5-anhydro-4-deoxy-D-glycero-hex-3-en-2-ulose $\rightleftharpoons$ 1,5-anhydro-4-deoxy-D-glycero-hex-1-en-3-ulose

Hence, this enzyme has one substrate, 1,5-anhydro-4-deoxy-D-glycero-hex-3-en-2-ulose, and one product, 1,5-anhydro-4-deoxy-D-glycero-hex-1-en-3-ulose.

The enzyme is involved with the anhydrofructose pathway.

This enzyme belongs to the family of isomerases, specifically those intramolecular oxidoreductases interconverting keto- and enol-groups. The systematic name of this enzyme class is 1,5-anhydro-4-deoxy-D-glycero-hex-3-en-2-ulose Delta3-Delta1-isomerase. Other names in common use include ascopyrone isomerase, ascopyrone intramolecular oxidoreductase, 1,5-anhydro-D-glycero-hex-3-en-2-ulose tautomerase, APM tautomerase, ascopyrone P tautomerase, and APTM.

== See also ==
- Anhydrofructose pathway
- 1,5-anhydro-D-fructose dehydratase
- exo-(1→4)-α-D-glucan lyase
