= Arogenate dehydrogenase =

Class of enzymes

cyclohexadienyl dehydrogenase

Identifiers
- EC no.: 1.3.1.43
- CAS no.: 64295-75-6

Databases
- IntEnz: IntEnz view
- BRENDA: BRENDA entry
- ExPASy: NiceZyme view
- KEGG: KEGG entry
- MetaCyc: metabolic pathway
- PRIAM: profile
- PDB structures: RCSB PDB PDBe PDBsum
- Gene Ontology: AmiGO / QuickGO
Search
- PMC: articles
- PubMed: articles
- NCBI: proteins

In enzymology, arogenate dehydrogenase (EC 1.3.1.43) is an enzyme that catalyzes the chemical reaction

L-arogenate
+ NAD^{+}
CO_{2}
CO_{2}
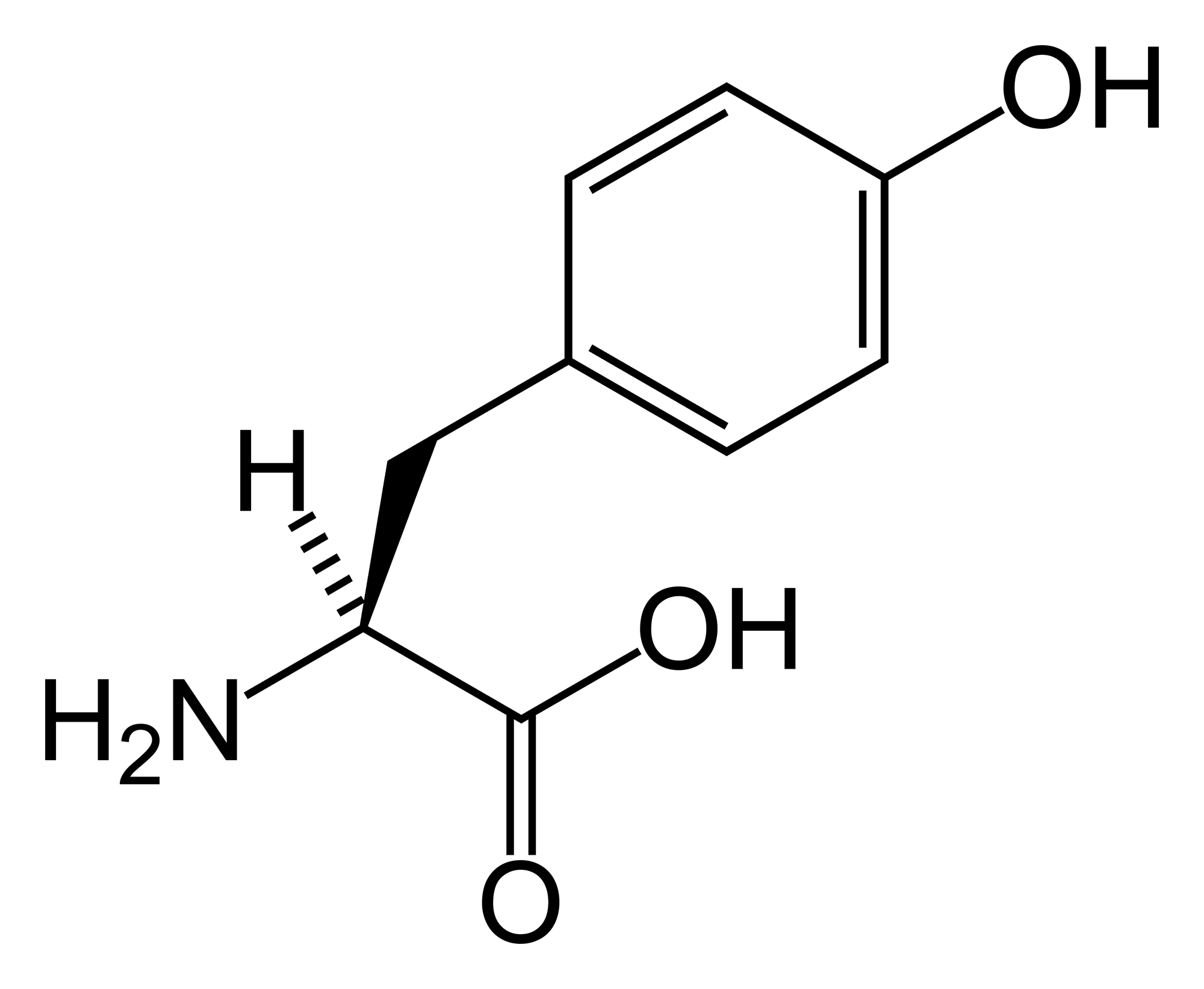
L-tyrosine
+ NADH

The two substrates of this enzyme are L-arogenic acid (shown as its conjugate base arogenate) and oxidised nicotinamide adenine dinucleotide (NAD^{+}). Its products are L-tyrosine, reduced NADH, and carbon dioxide.

This enzyme belongs to the family of oxidoreductases, specifically those acting on the CH-CH group of donor with NAD+ or NADP+ as acceptor. The systematic name of this enzyme class is L-arogenate:NAD+ oxidoreductase (decarboxylating). Other names in common use include arogenic dehydrogenase (ambiguous), cyclohexadienyl dehydrogenase, pretyrosine dehydrogenase (ambiguous), and L-arogenate:NAD+ oxidoreductase. This enzyme participates in phenylalanine, tyrosine and tryptophan biosynthesis and novobiocin biosynthesis.

== Structural studies ==
As of late 2007, only one structure has been solved for this class of enzymes, with the PDB accession code 2F1K.
