= Tyrosine aminotransferase =

Mammalian protein found in Homo sapiens

Tyrosine transaminase
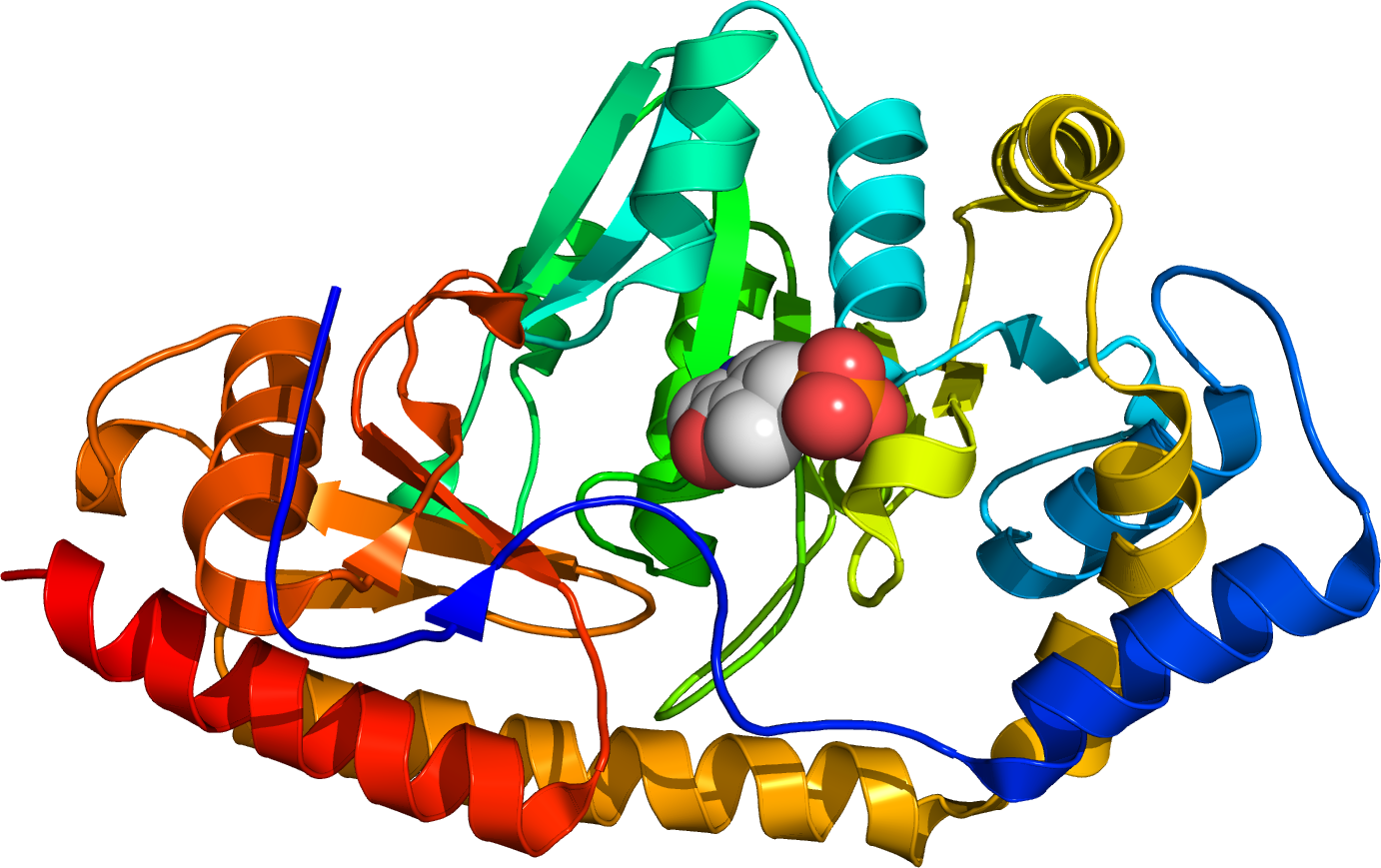
- Human tyrosine aminotransferase (rainbow colored, N-terminus = blue, C-terminus = red) complexed with pyridoxal phosphate (space-filling model).

Identifiers
- EC no.: 2.6.1.5
- CAS no.: 9014-55-5

Databases
- BRENDA: enzyme data
- ExPASy: NiceZyme view
- KEGG: enzyme entry
- MetaCyc: metabolic pathway
- Rhea: reactions
- PDB structures: RCSB PDB PDBe PDBsum
- Gene Ontology: AmiGO / QuickGO
Search
- PMC: articles
- PubMed: articles
- NCBI: proteins

TAT

Identifiers
- Aliases: TAT, Tat, tyrosine aminotransferase
- External IDs: OMIM: 613018; MGI: 98487; GeneCards: TAT
Available structures
PDB	Ortholog search: PDBe RCSB
PDB	List of PDB id codes 3DYD
Enzyme activity
EC #	BRENDA	ExPASy	KEGG	MetaCyc
2.6.1.5	↗	↗	↗	↗

Gene location (Human)
Chr.	Chromosome 16 (human)
Band	16q22.2	Start	71,565,660 bp
Band	16q22.2	End	71,577,092 bp

Gene location (Mouse)
Chr.	Chromosome 8 (mouse)
Band	8 D3|8 57.38 cM	Start	110,717,069 bp
Band	8 D3|8 57.38 cM	End	110,726,435 bp
RNA expression pattern
Bgee	Human / Mouse (ortholog); Top expressed in: right lobe of liver; buccal mucosa cell; testicle; tendon of biceps brachii; lactiferous duct; secondary oocyte; mucosa of transverse colon; pancreatic ductal cell; islet of Langerhans; skin of thigh / Top expressed in: left lobe of liver; gallbladder; blastocyst; morula; embryo; islet of Langerhans; left colon; sexually immature organism; thoracic diaphragm; ileum; More reference expression data
BioGPS	n/a
Gene ontology
Molecular function	transferase activity; amino acid binding; transaminase activity; catalytic activity; L-tyrosine:2-oxoglutarate aminotransferase activity; pyridoxal phosphate binding; protein binding
Cellular component	cytosol; mitochondrion; cellular component
Biological process	response to organic cyclic compound; cellular amino acid metabolic process; response to glucocorticoid; L-phenylalanine catabolic process; biosynthetic process; 2-oxoglutarate metabolic process; response to oxidative stress; aromatic amino acid family metabolic process; tyrosine catabolic process; glutamate metabolic process; response to mercury ion; aromatic amino acid family catabolic process
Sources:Amigo / QuickGO
Orthologs
Databases	NCBI: entry; OMA: entry
Species	Human	Mouse
Entrez	6898	234724
Ensembl	ENSG00000198650	ENSMUSG00000001670
UniProt	P17735	Q8QZR1
RefSeq (mRNA)	NM_000353	NM_146214
RefSeq (protein)	NP_000344	NP_666326
Location (UCSC)	Chr 16: 71.57 – 71.58 Mb	Chr 8: 110.72 – 110.73 Mb
PubMed search
- Wikidata
View/Edit Human	View/Edit Mouse

Tyrosine aminotransferase (or tyrosine transaminase) is an enzyme present in the liver and catalyzes the conversion of tyrosine to 4-hydroxyphenylpyruvate.

L-tyrosine + 2-oxoglutarate $\rightleftharpoons$ 4-hydroxyphenylpyruvate + L-glutamate

In humans, the tyrosine aminotransferase protein is encoded by the TAT gene. A deficiency of the enzyme in humans can result in what is known as type II tyrosinemia, wherein there is an abundance of tyrosine as a result of tyrosine failing to undergo an aminotransferase reaction to form 4-hydroxyphenylpyruvate.

== Function ==
Tyrosine aminotransferase (TAT) is a pyridoxal phosphate (PLP)-dependent enzyme that catalyzes the first and rate-limiting step in the degradation of the amino acid tyrosine, transferring its amino group to α-ketoglutarate to produce 4-hydroxyphenylpyruvate and glutamate. This reaction is essential for tyrosine catabolism and energy production, as the resulting products feed into the citric acid cycle. TAT is predominantly expressed in the liver but is also present in other tissues, where it maintains narrow substrate specificity, favoring tyrosine over other aromatic amino acids such as phenylalanine. Structurally, TAT contains a central catalytic core and a PLP-binding site critical for its enzymatic function.

== Structure ==
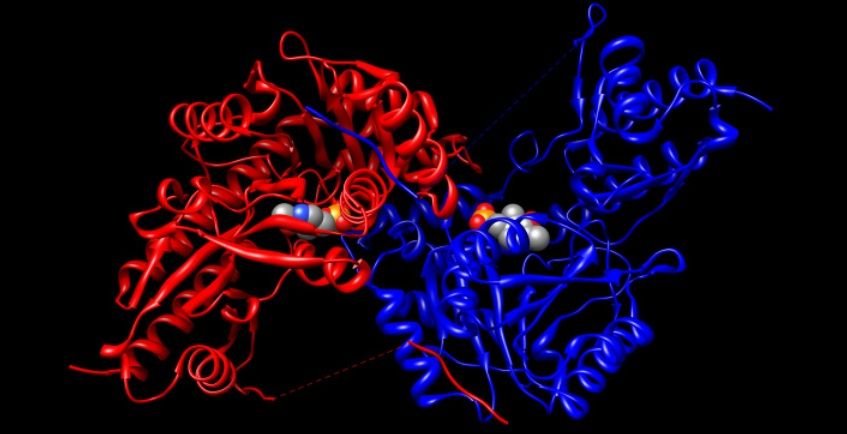
Ribbon diagram of the tyrosine aminotransferase dimer. The prosthetic group PLP is visible in both monomers.

Tyrosine aminotransferase is a dimeric enzyme composed of two identical subunits, each containing a central catalytic core and a smaller domain formed by both amino- and carboxyl-terminal regions. The enzyme's active site features a lysine residue (Lys280 in humans) that forms a Schiff base with the pyridoxal phosphate (PLP) cofactor, which is essential for its transaminase activity. Structural studies, including crystallography, reveal that the PLP cofactor is stabilized within the active site through interactions with nonpolar amino acid side chains and hydrogen bonding, facilitating precise substrate positioning and catalysis. Additionally, the carboxyl terminus contains hydrophilic, glutamate-rich segments resembling PEST sequences, which may contribute to the enzyme's rapid degradation rate. The overall architecture of tyrosine aminotransferase aligns it with the aminotransferase superfamily, sharing conserved residues critical for function and substrate specificity.

== Mechanism ==
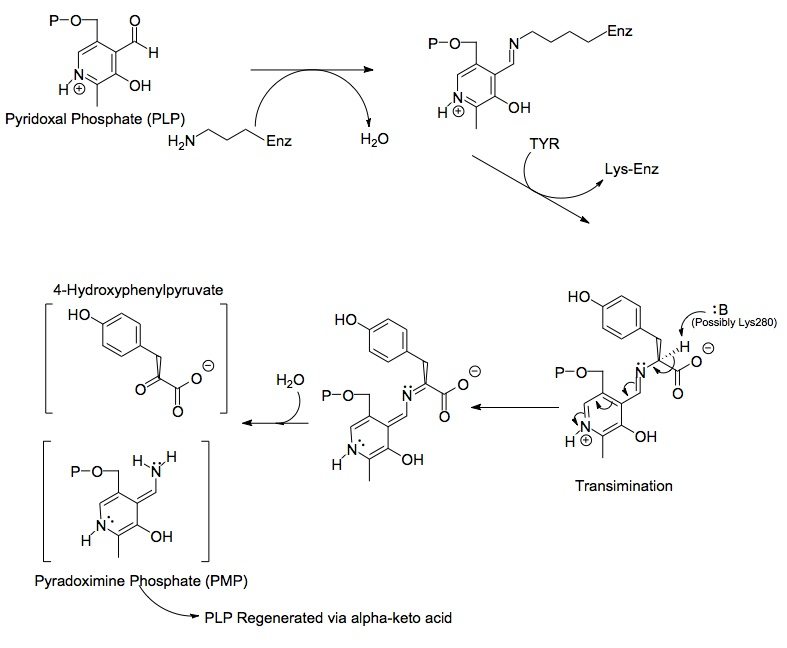
Mechanism of catalysis

Structures of the three main molecules involved in chemical reaction catalyzed by the tyrosine aminotransferase enzyme are shown below: the amino acid tyrosine (left), the prosthetic group pyridoxal phosphate (right), and the resulting product 4-hydroxyphenylpyruvate (center).

Each side of the dimer protein includes pyridoxal phosphate (PLP) bonded to the Lys280 residue of the tyrosine aminotransferase molecule. The amine group of tyrosine attacks the alpha carbon of the imine bonded to Lys280, forming a tetrahedral complex and then kicking off the LYS-ENZ. This process is known as transimination by the act of switching out the imine group bonded to PLP. The newly formed PLP-TYR molecule is then attacked by a base.

A possible candidate for the base in the mechanism could be Lys280 that was just pushed off of PLP, which sequesters the newly formed amino group of the PLP-TYR molecule. In a similar mechanism of aspartate transaminase, the lysine that forms the initial imine to PLP later acts as the base that attacks the tyrosine in transimination. The electrons left behind from the loss of the proton move down to form a new double bond to the imine, which in turn pushes the already double bonded electrons through PLP and end up as a lone pair on the positively charged nitrogen in the six-membered ring of the molecule. Water attacks the alpha carbon of the imine of PLP-TYR and through acyl substitution kicks off the nitrogen of PLP and forming pyridoxamine phosphate (PMP) and 4-hydroxyphenylpyruvate.

PMP is then regenerated into PLP by transferring its amine group to alpha-ketoglutarate, reforming its aldehyde functional group. This is followed by another substitution reaction with the Lys280 residue to reform its imine linkage to the enzyme, forming ENZ-PLP.

== Clinical significance ==
Deficiency of TAT activity leads to tyrosinemia type II, a metabolic disorder marked by elevated blood tyrosine levels and symptoms including keratitis, skin lesions, and neurological impairment.

Tyrosinemia is the most common metabolic disease associated with tyrosine aminotransferase. The disease results from a deficiency in hepatic tyrosine aminotransferase. Tyrosinemia type II (Richner-Hanhart syndrome, RHS) is a disease of autosomal recessive inheritance characterized by keratitis, palmoplantar hyperkeratosis, mental retardation, and elevated blood tyrosine levels. Keratitis in Tyrosinemia type II patients is caused by the deposition of tyrosine crystals in the cornea and results in corneal inflammation. The TAT gene is located on human chromosome 16q22-24 and extends over 10.9 kilobases (kb) containing 12 exons, and its 3.0 kb mRNA codes for a 454-amino acid protein of 50.4 kDa. Twelve different TAT gene mutations have been reported.
