= 3,4-Dihydroxyphenylacetic acid =

Names
- Preferred IUPAC name (3,4-Dihydroxyphenyl)acetic acid
- Other names 2-(3,4-Dihydroxyphenyl)acetic acid

Identifiers
CAS Number	102-32-9
3D model (JSmol)	Interactive image
ChEBI	CHEBI:41941
ChEMBL	ChEMBL1284
ChemSpider	532
DrugBank	DB01702
ECHA InfoCard	100.002.750
KEGG	C01161
MeSH	3,4-Dihydroxyphenylacetic+Acid
PubChem CID	547
UNII	KEX5N0R4N5
CompTox Dashboard (EPA)	DTXSID9074430
- InChI: InChI=1S/C8H8O4/c9-6-2-1-5(3-7(6)10)4-8(11)12/h1-3,9-10H,4H2,(H,11,12) Key: CFFZDZCDUFSOFZ-UHFFFAOYSA-N; InChI=1/C8H8O4/c9-6-2-1-5(3-7(6)10)4-8(11)12/h1-3,9-10H,4H2,(H,11,12) Key: CFFZDZCDUFSOFZ-UHFFFAOYAU
- SMILES: O=C(O)Cc1cc(O)c(O)cc1

Properties
Chemical formula	C_{8}H_{8}O_{4}
Molar mass	168.148 g·mol^{−1}
- Except where otherwise noted, data are given for materials in their standard state (at 25 °C [77 °F], 100 kPa). verify (what is ?) Infobox references

3,4-Dihydroxyphenylacetic acid (DOPAC) is a metabolite of the neurotransmitter dopamine. Dopamine can be metabolized into one of three substances. One such substance is DOPAC. Another is 3-methoxytyramine (3-MT). Both of these substances are degraded to form homovanillic acid (HVA). Both degradations involve the enzymes monoamine oxidase (MAO) and catechol-O-methyl transferase (COMT), albeit in reverse order: MAO catalyzes dopamine to DOPAC, and COMT catalyzes DOPAC to HVA; whereas COMT catalyzes dopamine to 3-MT and MAO catalyzes 3-MT to HVA. The third metabolic end-product of dopamine is norepinephrine (noradrenaline).

Biodegradation of dopamine

It can also be found in the bark of Eucalyptus globulus.

This product has been synthesized (52% yield) from 4-hydroxyphenylacetic acid via aerobic biotransformation using whole cell cultures of Arthrobacter protophormiae.
