= Hydro-lyase =

Type of enzyme

Hydro-lyases (EC 4.2.1) are a type of enzyme. As lyases, hydro-lyases cleave various chemical bonds by means other than hydrolysis and oxidation. Examples of specific hydro-lyases include carbonic anhydrase (EC 4.2.1.1) and fumarase (EC 4.2.1.2).
