= Prephenate dehydratase =

prephenate dehydratase
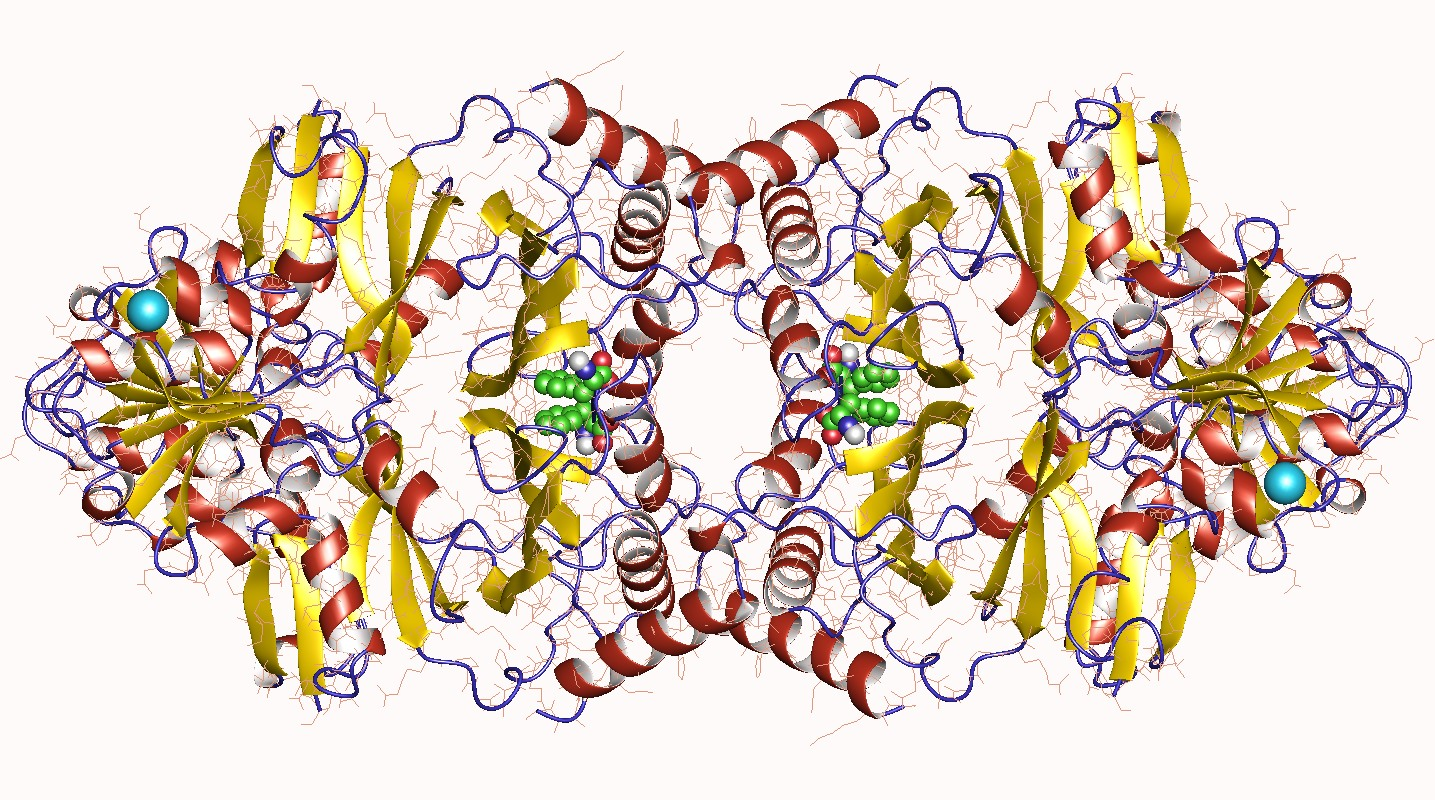
- Prephenate dehydratase homotetramer, Paenarthrobacter aurescens

Identifiers
- EC no.: 4.2.1.51
- CAS no.: 9044-88-6

Databases
- IntEnz: IntEnz view
- BRENDA: BRENDA entry
- ExPASy: NiceZyme view
- KEGG: KEGG entry
- MetaCyc: metabolic pathway
- PRIAM: profile
- PDB structures: RCSB PDB PDBe PDBsum
- Gene Ontology: AmiGO / QuickGO
Search
- PMC: articles
- PubMed: articles
- NCBI: proteins

The enzyme prephenate dehydratase (EC 4.2.1.51) catalyzes the chemical reaction:

prephenic acid
CO_{2} + H_{2}O
CO_{2} + H_{2}O
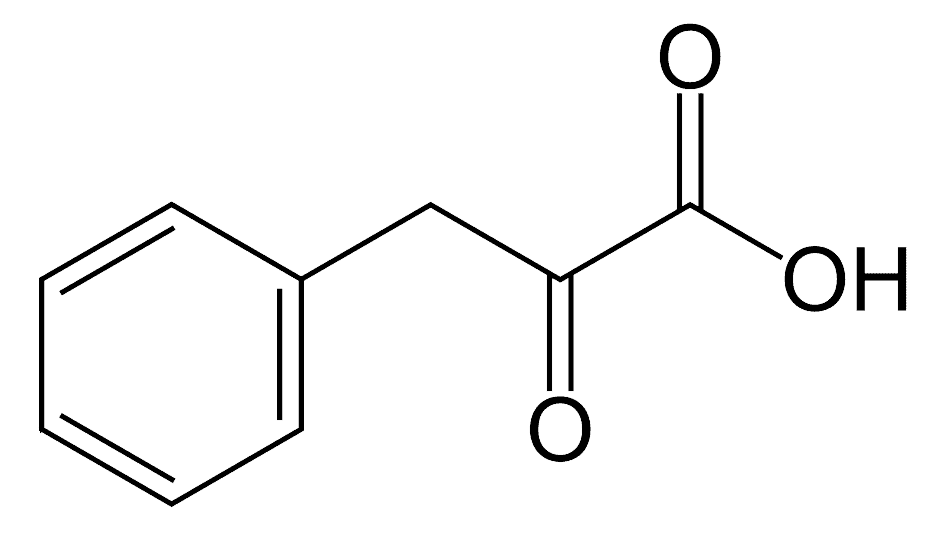
phenylpyruvic acid

This enzyme belongs to the family of lyases, specifically the hydro-lyases, which cleave carbon-oxygen bonds. The systematic name of this enzyme class is prephenate hydro-lyase (decarboxylating; phenylpyruvate-forming). This enzyme is also called prephenate hydro-lyase (decarboxylating). This enzyme participates in phenylalanine, tyrosine and tryptophan biosynthesis.

== Structural studies ==
As of late 2007, only one structure has been solved for this class of enzymes, with the PDB accession code 2QMX.
