= Prephenic acid =

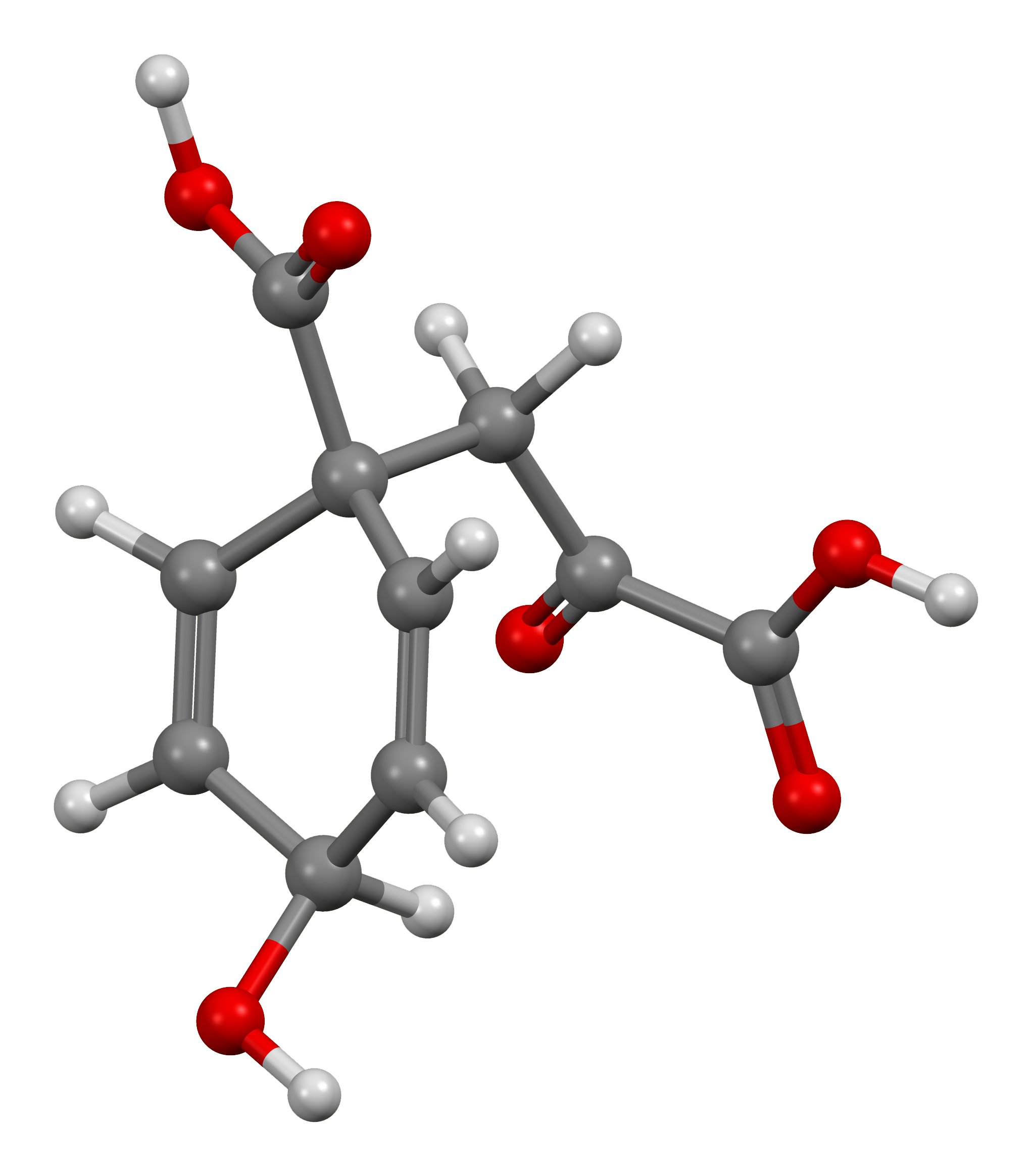

Names
- Preferred IUPAC name (1s,4s)-1-(2-Carboxy-2-oxoethyl)-4-hydroxycyclohexa-2,5-diene-1-carboxylic acid
- Other names Prephenate; cis-1-Carboxy-4-hydroxy-α-oxo-2,5-cyclohexadiene-1-propanoic acid

Identifiers
CAS Number	126-49-8 (unspecified); 87664-40-2 (cis)
3D model (JSmol)	Interactive image
ChEBI	CHEBI:84387
ChemSpider	16735981
MeSH	Prephenic+acid
PubChem CID	1028 (unspecified)
UNII	Z66B98Z97I (unspecified)
CompTox Dashboard (EPA)	DTXSID60894109
- InChI: InChI=1S/C10H10O6/c11-6-1-3-10(4-2-6,9(15)16)5-7(12)8(13)14/h1-4,6,11H,5H2,(H,13,14)(H,15,16)/t6-,10+ Key: FPWMCUPFBRFMLH-XGAOUMNUSA-N; InChI=1/C10H10O6/c11-6-1-3-10(4-2-6,9(15)16)5-7(12)8(13)14/h1-4,6,11H,5H2,(H,13,14)(H,15,16)/t6-,10+ Key: FPWMCUPFBRFMLH-XGAOUMNUBN
- SMILES: O=C(O)[C@@]/1(CC(=O)C(O)=O)\C=C/[C@@H](O)\C=C\1

Properties
Chemical formula	C_{10}H_{10}O_{6}
Molar mass	226.184 g·mol^{−1}
- Except where otherwise noted, data are given for materials in their standard state (at 25 °C [77 °F], 100 kPa). verify (what is ?) Infobox references

Prephenic acid, commonly also known by its anionic form prephenate, is an intermediate in the biosynthesis of the aromatic amino acids phenylalanine and tyrosine, as well as of a large number of secondary metabolites of the shikimate pathway.

== Occurrence and biological significance ==
Prephenic acid occurs naturally as an intermediate in the biosynthesis of phenylalanine and tyrosine via the shikimic acid pathway. It is formed from chorismic acid by chorismate mutase:

The biosynthesis involves a [3,3]-sigmatropic Claisen rearrangement of chorismic acid.

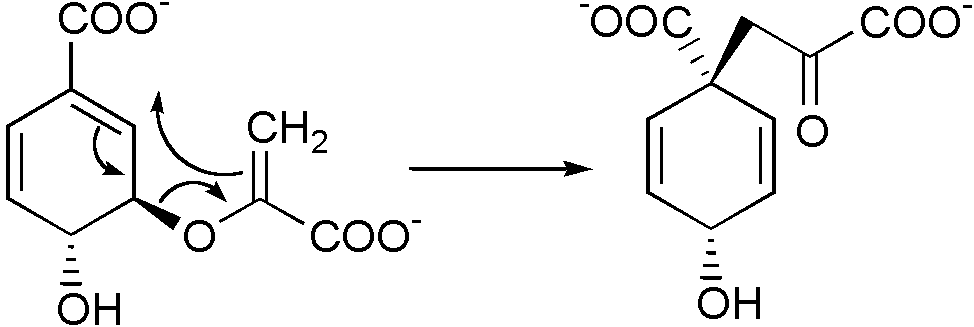

Prephenic acid can be dehydrated by prephenate dehydratase to phenylpyruvic acid, which is a precursor of phenylalanine.

prephenic acid
CO_{2} + H_{2}O
CO_{2} + H_{2}O
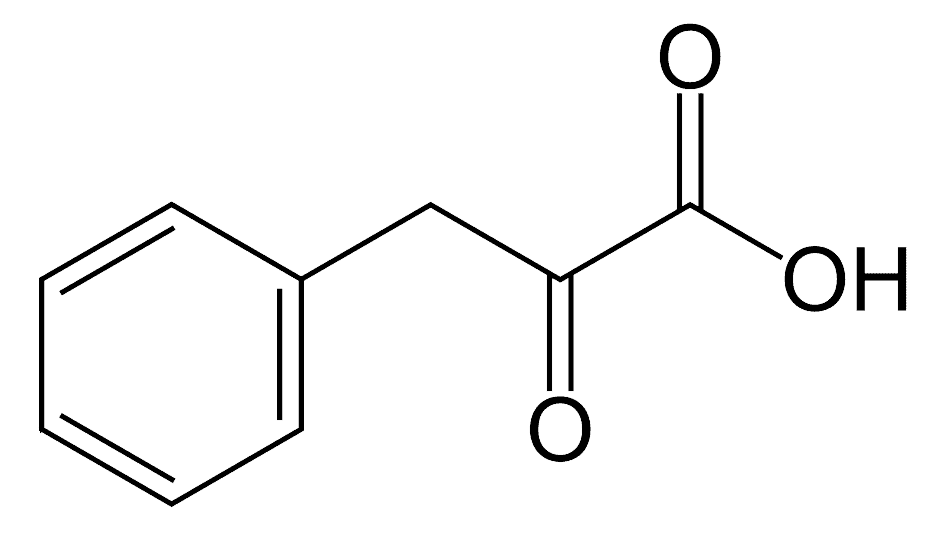
phenylpyruvic acid

Alternatively, it can be decarboxylated and oxidised by prephenate dehydrogenase to give 4-hydroxyphenylpyruvic acid, which is a precursor of tyrosine:

prephenic acid
+ NADP^{+}
CO_{2} + H^{+}
CO_{2} + H^{+}
4-hydroxyphenylpyruvic acid
+ NADPH

== Synthesis ==
Prephenic acid is unstable; as a 1,4-cyclohexadiene, it is easily aromatized, for example, under the influence of acids or bases. This instability makes both isolation and synthesis difficult. Prephenic acid was first isolated from mutants of Escherichia coli that were unable to convert prephenic acid to phenylpyruvic acid. During this process, the barium salt was obtained.

== Stereochemistry ==
Prephenic acid is an example of achiral (optically inactive) molecule which has two pseudoasymmetric atoms (i.e. stereogenic but not chirotopic centers), the C1 and the C4 cyclohexadiene ring atoms. It has been shown that of the two possible diastereoisomers, the natural prephenic acid is one that has both substituents at higher priority (according to CIP rules) on the two pseudoasymmetric carbons, i.e. the carboxyl and the hydroxyl groups, in the cis configuration, or (1s,4s) according to the new IUPAC stereochemistry rules (2013).

The other stereoisomer, i.e. trans or, better, (1r,4r), is called epiprephenic.

== See also ==
- C_{10}H_{10}O_{6}
