= 4-Hydroxyphenylacetic acid =

- Chemical structure of 4-hydroxyphenylacetic acid

Names
- Preferred IUPAC name (4-Hydroxyphenyl)acetic acid
- Other names p-Hydroxyphenylacetic acid

Identifiers
CAS Number	156-38-7
3D model (JSmol)	Interactive image
Beilstein Reference	1448766
ChEBI	CHEBI:18101
ChEMBL	ChEMBL1772
ChemSpider	124
ECHA InfoCard	100.005.321
EC Number	205-851-3
KEGG	C00642
PubChem CID	127
UNII	3J9SHG0RCN
CompTox Dashboard (EPA)	DTXSID5059745
- InChI: InChI=1S/C8H8O3/c9-7-3-1-6(2-4-7)5-8(10)11/h1-4,9H,5H2,(H,10,11) Key: XQXPVVBIMDBYFF-UHFFFAOYSA-N
- SMILES: O=C(O)Cc1ccc(O)cc1

Properties
Chemical formula	C_{8}H_{8}O_{3}
Molar mass	152.149 g·mol^{−1}
Appearance	white powder
Melting point	150 °C (302 °F; 423 K)

Hazards
Safety data sheet (SDS)	MSDS at Sigma Aldrich
- Except where otherwise noted, data are given for materials in their standard state (at 25 °C [77 °F], 100 kPa). verify (what is ?) Infobox references

4-Hydroxyphenylacetic acid is an organic compound with the formula HOC_{6}H_{4}CH_{2}CO_{2}H. It is a colorless or white solid but commercial samples can appear beige. It is found in olive oil and beer.

== Synthesis ==
4-Hydroxyphenylacetic acid is obtained by reducing 4-hydroxymandelic acid with elemental phosphorus and iodine.

=== Uses ===
In industry, 4-hydroxyphenylacetic acid is an intermediate to atenolol, 3,4-dihydroxyphenylacetic acid, and coclaurine.
