= 4-Hydroxyphenylpyruvic acid =

Names
- Preferred IUPAC name 3-(4-Hydroxyphenyl)-2-oxopropanoic acid
- Other names 4-Hydroxyphenylpyruvate p-Hydroxyphenylpyruvic acid p-Hydroxyphenylpyruvate

Identifiers
CAS Number	156-39-8
3D model (JSmol)	Interactive image
ChEBI	CHEBI:15999
ChEMBL	ChEMBL607712
ChemSpider	954
DrugBank	DB07718
ECHA InfoCard	100.005.322
IUPHAR/BPS	6629
KEGG	C01179
PubChem CID	979
UNII	0YP1694WNQ
CompTox Dashboard (EPA)	DTXSID80166017
- InChI: InChI=1S/C9H8O4/c10-7-3-1-6(2-4-7)5-8(11)9(12)13/h1-4,10H,5H2,(H,12,13) Key: KKADPXVIOXHVKN-UHFFFAOYSA-N; InChI=1/C9H8O4/c10-7-3-1-6(2-4-7)5-8(11)9(12)13/h1-4,10H,5H2,(H,12,13) Key: KKADPXVIOXHVKN-UHFFFAOYAH
- SMILES: O=C(O)C(=O)Cc1ccc(O)cc1

Properties
Chemical formula	C_{9}H_{8}O_{4}
Molar mass	180.157 g/mol
Melting point	219–220 °C (426–428 °F; 492–493 K)

Hazards
- GHS labelling
Pictograms	(GHS07: Exclamation mark)
- Except where otherwise noted, data are given for materials in their standard state (at 25 °C [77 °F], 100 kPa). verify (what is ?) Infobox references

4-Hydroxyphenylpyruvic acid (4-HPPA) is an intermediate in the metabolism of the amino acid phenylalanine. The aromatic side chain of phenylalanine is hydroxylated by the enzyme phenylalanine hydroxylase to form tyrosine. The conversion from tyrosine to 4-HPPA is in turn catalyzed by tyrosine aminotransferase. Additionally, 4-HPPA can be converted to homogentisic acid which is one of the precursors to ochronotic pigment.

It is an intermediary compound in the biosynthesis of scytonemin.

== See also ==
- 4-Hydroxyphenylpyruvate dioxygenase
