= List of Callistemon cultivars =

This is a list of cultivars of the plant genus Callistemon.

Cultivar	Image	Registration	Parentage and notes	Reference
(Austraflora cultivars)			listed by second name, e.g. 'Austraflora Firebrand' > 'Firebrand'	
'Bob Bailey'		ACRA, 1985	Seedling of Callistemon viminalis	
'Burgundy'		ACRA, 1967	Seedling of Callistemon 'Reeves Pink'	
'Candle Glow'		ACRA, 1985	Seedling of Callistemon pallidus, also known as 'Austraflora Candle Glow'	
'Cane's Hybrid'				
'Captain Cook'				
'Cinderella'		ACRA, 1981	Garden origin, 1966	
'Country Sprite'		ACRA, 1990	Seedling of 'Glasshouse Country'	
'Dawson River Weeper'		ACRA, 1984	Form of Callistemon viminalis from Dawson River area, Queensland	
'Demesne Rowena'		ACRA, 1982	Cross of two Callistemon citrinus cultivars 'Splendens' and 'White Anzac' in 1979	
'Endeavour'			see 'Splendens'	
'Eureka'				
'Firebrand'		ACRA, 1979	Originally registered as 'Austraflora Firebrand', seedling of unknown origin first planted in 1973	
'Glasshouse Country'		ACRA, 1985	Cross between Callistemon sp. (Tinaroo) and Callistemon salignus	
'Glasshouse Gem'		ACRA, 1985	Cross between Callistemon sp. (Tinaroo) and Callistemon salignus, originated mid 1960s	
'Hannah Ray'				
'Hannah's Child'		ACRA, 1992	Cross between 'Hannah Ray' and 'Kings Park Special' selected in 1987	
'Harkness'		ACRA, 1974	Also known as 'Gawler' or 'Gawler Hybrid'. Seedling of Callistemon citrinus obtained in 1937	
'Jeffersii'				
'Kempsey'		ACRA, 1987	Seedling of 'Maffra Pastel Pink'	
'Kings Park Special'		ACRA, 1980	Seedling of unknown origin raised in Kings Park, Perth	
'Lilacinus'				
'Little John'			Dwarf shrub selected by Ken Dunstan of Alstonville, New South Wales	
'Mary MacKillop'			'Hannah Ray' x 'Splendens'. Released by Austraflora in 2001.	
'Matthew Flinders'		PBR, 2005		
'Mauve Mist'		ACRA, 1967	Seedling of 'Reeves Pink'	
'Moonbeam'			see 'White Anzac'	
'Ngungun Red'		ACRA, 1988	Also known as 'Ngun Ngun', seedling of Callistemon recurvus x Callistemon salignus first planted in 1981	
'Packers Selection'		ACRA, 1980	Seedling from Callistemon subulatus	
'Perth Pink'		ACRA, 1993	Seedling selection of Callistemon salignus c. 1960	
'Pink Sensation'		ACRA, 1991	Seedling of 'Glasshouse Gem'	
'Prolific'		ACRA, ?	Form of Callistemon viminalis from Dalby, Queensland	
'Red Reika'		ACRA, 1984	Seedling selection from 'Harkness'	
'Reeves Pink'		ACRA, 1967	Seedling of unknown parentage from Cheltenham, Victoria; shares characteristics with Callistemon citrinus	
'Rose Opal'		ACRA, 1980	Selected form of Callistemon viminalis from Wappa Falls on the Maroochy River, Queensland (1956)	
'Sallyann'		ACRA, 1983	Selected pink-flowered form of Callistemon paludosus	
'Smoked Salmon'		ACRA, ?	Selected pink-flowering form of Callistemon pachyphyllus from Runaway Bay, Queensland, first cultivated in 1976	
'Splendens'		ACRA, 1989	A form of Callistemon citrinus of unknown origin, promoted in 1970 under the name 'Endeavour' by the Australian nursery industry	
'Tin-Sal Glow'		ACRA, 1989	Thought to be a hybrid of 'Glasshouse Country' and Callistemon recurvus (Tinaroo).	
'Western Glory'		ACRA, 1980	Seedling of Callistemon citrinus selected in Wanneroo, Western Australia	
'White Anzac'		ACRA, 1981	White-flowering form selected from a naturally occurring population in New South Wales. The cultivar 'Moonbeam' registered in 1964 is regarded as a synonym	
'Wilderness White'		ACRA, 1985	White-flowering naturally occurring form from Copper Load Falls Dam, north Queensland.	
'Wollumbin'		ACRA, 1978	Salmon-flowering form of Callistemon viminalis raised in Wollumbin, New South Wales	
'Woolomin Sparkler'		ACRA, 1991	Hybrid of a pink-flowering form of Callistemon salignus and 'Harkness' or Callistemon citrinus selected in 1987	

== See also ==
- Lists of cultivars

== General references ==
- Australian Cultivar Registration Authority - List of Registered Cultivars derived from Australian native flora
- IP Australia - Plant Breeder's Rights (PBR)
