= Captain Cook (disambiguation) =

Captain James Cook (1728–1779) was a British explorer, navigator, and mapmaker.

Captain Cook may also refer to:

== Arts, entertainment, and media ==
- Captain Cook (book), a 1972 book by Alistair MacLean
- "Captain Cook" (Blackadder), an episode of the British TV series Blackadder Goes Forth
- Captain Cook, the first penguin in the children's book Mr. Popper's Penguins

== People ==
- Alastair Cook (born 1984), English cricketer
- Ephraim Cook (mariner) (1737–1821)
- Henry Cooke (composer) (c. 1616 – 1672), also known as Captain Cook, English composer, choirmaster and singer
- Samuel H. Cook (fl. 1860s), Union officer of the American Civil War

=== Fictional characters ===
- Jesse Pinkman, alias and license plate "CAPNCOOK"

== Places ==
- Captain Cook, Hawaii, a town in Hawaii, U.S.
- Captain Cook State Recreation Area, a state park on the Kenai Peninsula, Alaska, U.S.
- Captain Cook Bridge, Sydney, Australia
- Captain Cook Bridge, Brisbane, Australia

== Ships ==
- Captain Cook (1826 ship)
- SS Captain Cook

== Other uses ==
- Callistemon 'Captain Cook', a plant cultivar
- The Hotel Captain Cook, a hotel in Anchorage, Alaska built by Wally Hickel

== See also ==
- Captain Hook (disambiguation)
