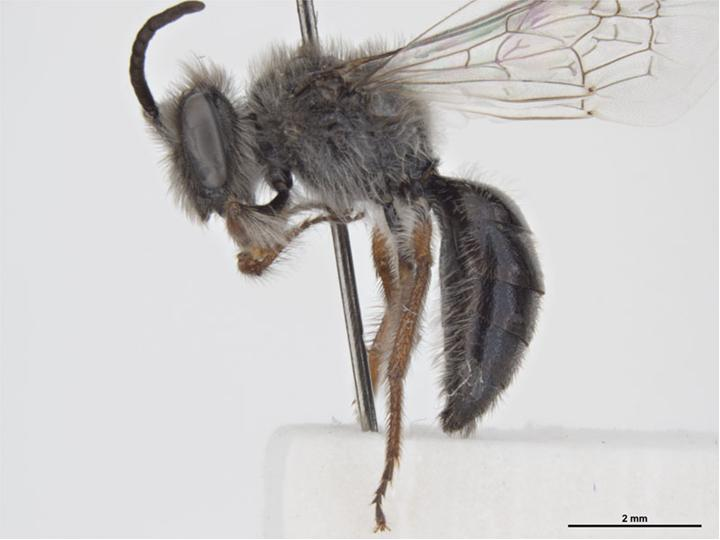
- Male

Scientific classification
- Kingdom: Animalia
- Phylum: Arthropoda
- Clade: Pancrustacea
- Class: Insecta
- Order: Hymenoptera
- Family: Colletidae
- Genus: Leioproctus
- Species: L. recusus

Binomial name
- Leioproctus recusus (Cockerell, 1921)

Synonyms
- Paracolletes recusus Cockerell, 1921; Paracolletes subviridis illawarraensis Rayment, 1954

= Leioproctus recusus =

Species of bee

Leioproctus recusus, or Leioproctus (Leioproctus) recusus, is a species of bee in the family Colletidae and subfamily Colletinae. It is endemic to Australia. It was described by British-American entomologist Theodore Dru Alison Cockerell in 1921.

== Description ==
Female body length is about 10 mm. Colouration is mainly black with some dark greenish markings.

== Distribution and habitat ==
The species occurs in eastern Australia. Type localities include Tamborine Mountain in south-eastern Queensland and Jamberoo in New South Wales.

== Behaviour ==
The adults are flying mellivores. Flowering plants visited by the bees include Leptospermum polygalifolium and Melaleuca salicina, as well as Eucalyptus species.

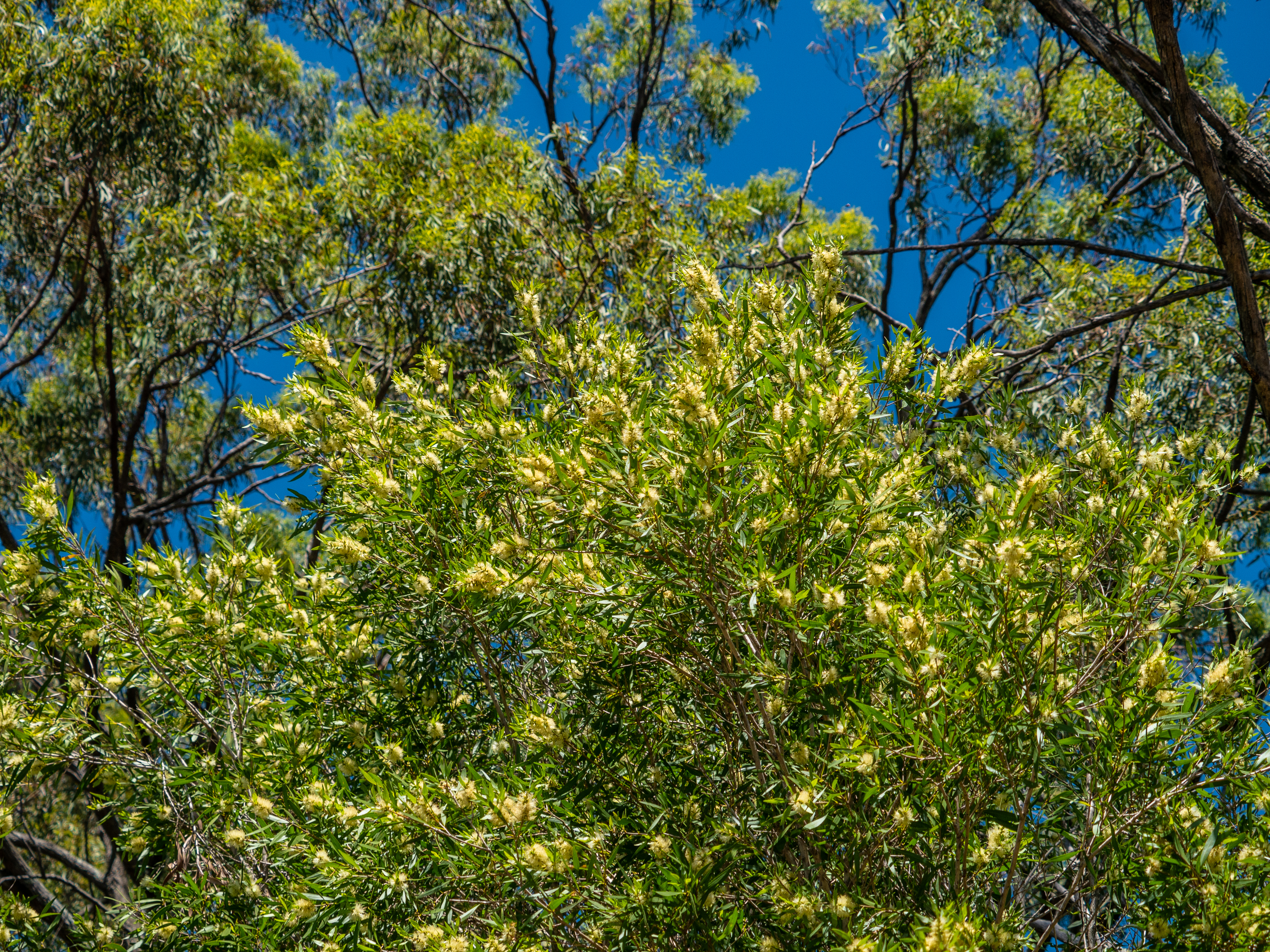
Melaleuca salicina (willow bottlebrush), a forage plant of the bees
