= Callistemon 'Lilacinus' =

Flowering plant cultivar

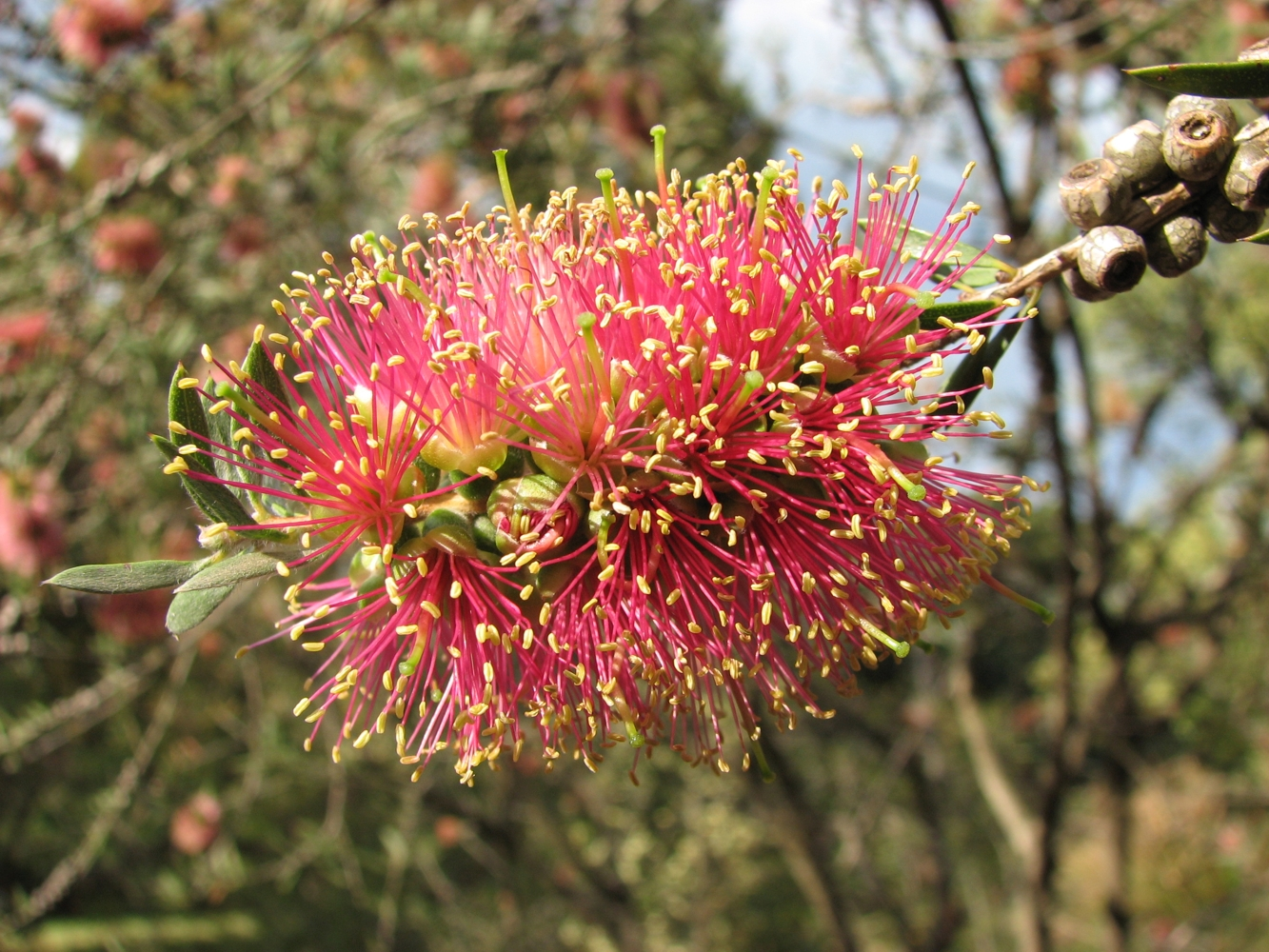
- Genus: Callistemon
- Cultivar: 'Lilacinus'
- Origin: Selected in Berlin in 1913.

Callistemon 'Lilacinus' is a cultivar of the genus Callistemon. It grows to between 2.5 and 4 metres high and has purplish-violet inflorescences. Leaves are smooth and sharp pointed, with thick margins and are 40 to 100 mm long and 6 to 18 mm wide.

The cultivar was first selected in Berlin in 1913 from plants raised from seed collected near Como, New South Wales by German botanist Ernst Betsche in 1894. At this time, it was referred to as C. lanceolatus var lilacina. In 1925 Edwin Cheel gave the cultivar the species name Callistemon lilacinus, but this was later brought in line with other cultivars and amended to C. 'Lilacinus'.

The cultivar has often been referred to as C. 'Violaceus'.

Two other forms of C.lilacinus were described by Cheel:

- C lilacinus f. albus, which was "discovered in nature" at Long Bay by Mr H. Burrell, and currently given the name C. citrinus 'Lilacinus Albus'.
- C lilacinus f. carminus, a reddish-purple flowering form exhibited at the Linnean Society of New South Wales and currently given the name C. citrinus 'Lilacinus Carminus'. It was raised by E. Ashby in South Australia.

== See also ==
- List of Callistemon cultivars
