= Gangstertown (Past-Present-Future) =

Single by Ch!pz

from the album Past:Present:Future
- Released: 2006
- Genre: Dance-pop
- Length: 3:15
- Label: Universal

Ch!pz singles chronology
"Carnival" (2005)	"Gangstertown (Past-Present-Future)" (2006)	"One Day When I Grow Up" (2006)

"Gangstertown (Past-Present-Future)" is a song by Dutch pop group Ch!pz. It is the first single for Part 1 EP released in 2006. The single reached the Top 5 of the Dutch Top 40 and No. 2 at Single Top 100.

== Charts ==
=== Weekly charts ===
Chart (2006–07)	Peak position
Austria (Ö3 Austria Top 40)	22
Belgium (Ultratop 50 Flanders)	38
Germany (GfK)	34
Netherlands (Dutch Top 40)	5
Netherlands (Single Top 100)	2
Switzerland (Schweizer Hitparade)	58

=== Year-end charts ===
Chart (2006)	Position
Netherlands (Dutch Top 40)	72
Netherlands (Single Top 100)	18
