= White bottlebrush =

White bottlebrush is the common name of several plants native to Australia and may refer to:

- Banksia integrifolia
- Callistemon salignus, endemic to eastern Australia
