= Carnival (Ch!pz song) =

Single by Ch!pz

from the album The World of Ch!pz
- Released: 2005
- Genre: Pop
- Length: 3:50
- Label: Universal

Ch!pz singles chronology
"One, Two, Three" (2005)	"Carnival" (2005)	"Gangstertown (Past-Present-Future)" (2006)

"Carnival" is a song by Dutch pop group Ch!pz. It’s reached number one on Netherlands Top 40 and 100. “Carnival” is part of the special and Christmas edition for Germany.

== Charts ==
=== Weekly charts ===
Chart (2005–06)	Peak position
Austria (Ö3 Austria Top 40)	28
Germany (GfK)	28
Netherlands (Dutch Top 40)	1
Netherlands (Single Top 100)	1
Switzerland (Schweizer Hitparade)	32

=== Year-end charts ===
Chart (2005)	Position
Netherlands (Dutch Top 40)	57
Netherlands (Single Top 100)	13
