= One Day When I Grow Up =

Single by Ch!pz

from the album Past:Present:Future
- Released: 22 September 2006
- Recorded: 2006
- Genre: Dance-pop
- Length: 3:17
- Label: Universal
- Songwriter(s): Eddy Zoëy, Ilona van Gelder, Jay Vandenberg
- Producer(s): Jay Vandenberg

Ch!pz singles chronology
"Gangstertown (Past-Present-Future)" (2006)	"One Day When I Grow Up" (2006)	"Christmas Time Is Here" (2006)

"One Day When I Grow Up" is a song by Dutch pop group Ch!pz, featured on the 2006 EP Past:Present:Future. It peaked at #7 on the Netherlands Dutch Top 40, and #2 on the Netherlands Single Top 100. The music video for the song was included on the EP's accompanying DVD.

== Charts ==
=== Weekly charts ===
Chart (2006)	Peak position
Belgium (Ultratip Bubbling Under Flanders)	13
Netherlands (Dutch Top 40)	7
Netherlands (Single Top 100)	2

=== Year-end charts ===
Chart (2006)	Position
Netherlands (Dutch Top 40)	92
Netherlands (Single Top 100)	68
