= Cowboy (Ch!pz song) =

2003 single by Ch!pz

Single by Ch!pz

from the album The Adventures of Ch!pz
- Released: 2003
- Length: 2:51
- Label: Glam Slam
- Songwriters: J. Struik, R. Esseboom
- Producer: Jay van den Berg

Ch!pz singles chronology
"Ch!pz in Black (Who You Gonna Call)" (2003)	"Cowboy" (2003)	"Captain Hook" (2004)

"Cowboy" is a song by Dutch pop group Ch!pz. It was released in the Netherlands in 2003 and peaked at number one on the Dutch Top 40 and Single Top 100 charts. It was then released in other areas of Europe across the next four year, reaching number one in Austria and Germany and peaking within the top 10 in Scotland, Sweden, and Switzerland.

== Music video ==
In the music video, Ch!pz are summoned from the Wild West and sent back in time to help the townsfolk stop a horse thief.

== Charts ==
=== Weekly charts ===
Chart (2003–2007)	Peak position
Austria (Ö3 Austria Top 40)	1
Belgium (Ultratop 50 Flanders)	37
Europe (Eurochart Hot 100)	6
Germany (GfK)	1
Netherlands (Dutch Top 40)	1
Netherlands (Single Top 100)	1
Scottish Singles Sales (Official Charts)	6
Sweden (Sverigetopplistan)	3
Switzerland (Schweizer Hitparade)	2
UK Singles (Official Charts)	44

=== Year-end charts ===
Chart (2003)	Position
Netherlands (Dutch Top 40)	47
Netherlands (Single Top 100)	6

Chart (2004)	Position
Netherlands (Single Top 100)	37

Chart (2005)	Position
Austria (Ö3 Austria Top 40)	24
Germany (Media Control GfK)	34
Switzerland (Schweizer Hitparade)	44

Chart (2006)	Position
Sweden (Hitlistan)	53

=== Decade-end charts ===
Chart (2000–2009)	Position
Netherlands (Single Top 100)	30

== Release history ==
Region	Date	Format(s)	Label(s)	Ref.
Netherlands	2003	CD	Glam Slam	
Germany	24 April 2005	CD	Universal Music	
