= Ch!pz in Black (Who You Gonna Call) =

2003 single by Ch!pz

Single by Ch!pz

from the album The Adventures of Ch!pz
- Released: 2003
- Length: 3:03
- Label: Universal
- Songwriter(s): Peter Hartmann, Jan Langhoff
- Producer(s): Peter Hartmann, Jan Langhoff

Ch!pz singles chronology
"Ch!pz in Black (Who You Gonna Call)" (2003)	"Cowboy" (2003)

"Ch!pz in Black (Who You Gonna Call)" is the debut single of Dutch pop music group Ch!pz. In the Netherlands, the song reached No. 2 on the Dutch Top 40 and No. 1 on the Single Top 100. The track also became a hit in several other European countries, reaching the top three in Austria, Germany, Sweden, and Switzerland.

== Charts ==
=== Weekly charts ===
Chart (2003–2006)	Peak position
Austria (Ö3 Austria Top 40)	2
Belgium (Ultratop 50 Flanders)	40
Europe (Eurochart Hot 100)	7
Germany (GfK)	2
Netherlands (Dutch Top 40)	2
Netherlands (Single Top 100)	1
Norway (VG-lista)	19
Sweden (Sverigetopplistan)	3
Switzerland (Schweizer Hitparade)	2

=== Year-end charts ===
Chart (2003)	Position
Netherlands (Dutch Top 40)	18
Netherlands (Single Top 100)	9

Chart (2005)	Position
Austria (Ö3 Austria Top 40)	4
Europe (Eurochart Hot 100)	63
Germany (Media Control GfK)	10
Switzerland (Schweizer Hitparade)	9

Chart (2006)	Position
Sweden (Hitlistan)	65

=== Decade-end charts ===
Chart (2000–2009)	Position
Netherlands (Single Top 100)	57

== Certifications ==
Region	Certification	Certified units/sales
Austria (IFPI Austria)	Gold	15,000^{*}
Germany (BVMI)	Gold	150,000^{^}
^{*} Sales figures based on certification alone.^{^} Shipments figures based on certification alone.
