= Callistemon 'Splendens' =

Flowering plant cultivar

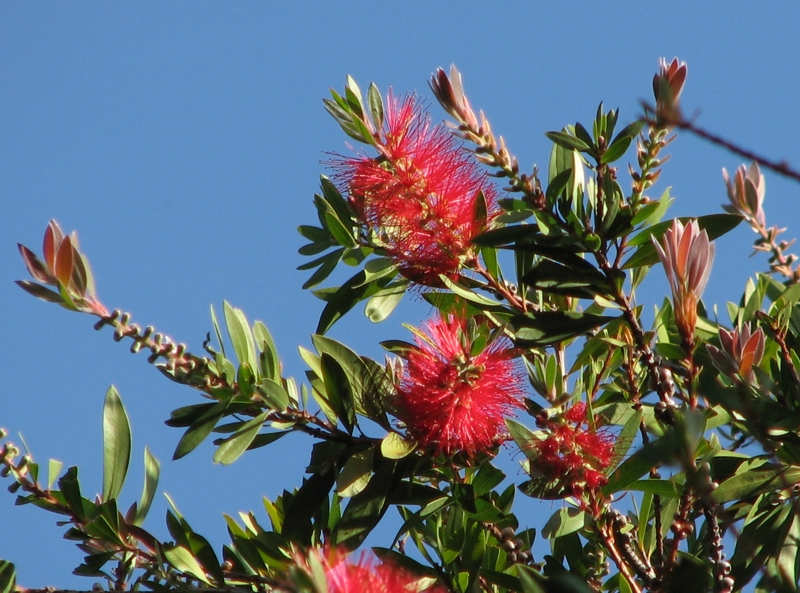
- Genus: Callistemon
- Cultivar: 'Splendens'
- Origin: Selection of Callistemon citrinus

Callistemon 'Splendens' is a commonly grown cultivar of the plant genus Callistemon. It has a compact and rounded habit and usually grows to about 2 metres (6 ft 7 in) high and wide, although it may grow taller. Large, well-displayed "brushes" are produced in late spring, with further flowering sometimes occurring at other times. New growth is pink-tinged and the leaves are elliptic and up to 90 mm long and 20 mm wide.

The cultivar, which has been in grown for many years, is of uncertain origin. It was originally known as Callistemon citrinus var. splendens, first formally described in 1925 in Botanical Magazine. In 1970 it was promoted under the name 'Endeavour' to mark the bicentennial of James Cook's voyage to Australia on the Endeavour. It was registered under the name Callistemon 'Splendens' with the Australian Cultivar Registration Authority in 1989.

This plant has gained the Royal Horticultural Society's Award of Garden Merit.

== Cultivation ==
The cultivar is most suited to climates ranging from temperate to sub-tropical. It adapts to most soils, and is tolerant of frost and salt spray.

== See also ==
- List of Callistemon cultivars
