= Captain Hook (Ch!pz song) =

Single by Ch!pz

from the album The Adventures of Ch!pz
- Released: 2004
- Genre: Eurodance
- Length: 3:29
- Label: Universal

Ch!pz singles chronology
"Cowboy" (2003)	"Captain Hook" (2004)	"1001 Arabian Nights" (2004)

"Captain Hook" is a song by Dutch pop group Ch!pz. It reached No. 5 in the Netherlands Top 40 and No. 3 in the Netherlands Top 100. It's certified Gold according to NVPI.

== Charts ==
=== Weekly charts ===
Chart (2004)	Peak position
Austria (Ö3 Austria Top 40)	9
Germany (GfK)	14
Netherlands (Dutch Top 40)	5
Netherlands (Single Top 100)	3
Switzerland (Schweizer Hitparade)	19

=== Year-end charts ===
Chart (2004)	Position
Netherlands (Dutch Top 40)	89
Netherlands (Single Top 100)	33
