= Ch!pz =

Dutch band

- Origin: Amsterdam, Netherlands
- Genres: Bubblegum pop; Europop; Eurodance
- Years active: 2003–2011; 2018–present
- Label: Universal
- Members: Kevin Hellenbrand; Rachel van den Hoogen; Cilla Niekoop; Peter Rost
- Website: chipz.nl

Ch!pz is a four-piece Dutch pop music group that originated in Amsterdam, Netherlands. The group was formed in 2003, after several rounds of tryouts for the youth-aimed network Fox Kids (then Jetix and Disney XD).

== Career ==
In the Netherlands, many radio stations initially would not play all of Ch!pz's songs because most of the listeners found their songs were too corny and childish or became annoying. However, due to promotions on Fox Kids, Ch!pz became one of the most well-known groups in the Netherlands. Within a year and a half, the group had three singles at the top of the Dutch singles charts. To date, five of their singles have reached number one. Their debut album, The Adventures of Ch!pz, was released in early 2004 in the Netherlands, which reached number two on the Dutch albums chart. In 2005, their second album, The World of Ch!pz, was released. Singles from it include "1001 Arabian Nights", "One, Two, Three!", and "Carnival", all of which peaked at the number one position.

At the start of the year 2005, "Ch!pz in Black", the group's first single, was released in Germany and climbed to the second position on the German charts. Shortly thereafter, in early-May 2005, their second single, "Cowboy", made it to the second position as well. A week later, the song reached the number one position.

Their videos are all of the same style; all four members of the group are in outlandish surroundings, and they all wear similar styles of clothing (for example, in "Ch!pz in Black", they all wear black-coloured outfits). As such, they overcome a horse thief in the Westerns-themed "Cowboy", aliens who kidnapped their fellow kids at camp in the scifi-themed "Ch!pz in Black", a magic lamp thief in the Middle Easterm-themed "1001 Arabian Nights", and in the superhero-themed "One, Two, Three!" they fight against their evil selves. All of this happens amidst clips of highly stylised dance moves, which inevitably defeat their enemies.

In April 2006, they released a new single in the Netherlands, "Gangstertown". Two months after its release, the single peaked at number five on the Dutch Top 40. An EP was also released, Past:Present:Future (Part 1). Also, a music video was shot for "Waikiki Beach", but was not released on the single. In late September, the single "One Day When I Grow Up" was released. It entered the Dutch charts at number 29 and climbed up to a peak of number seven. A second EP, Past:Present:Future (Part 2), was released in November 2006.

Four years after its original Dutch release, "Cowboy" was released in the United Kingdom on 12 February 2007, while "Ch!pz in Black" was originally slated for a 26 March release.

In December 2007, they released a new song, "Make a Big Splash". After, they appeared on a TV programme titled Chipz Dance Xperienz, in which they showed their choreographies. To support the programme, in September 2008, they released CDX (Chipz Dance Xperienz).

Ch!pz continued to tour during 2009 and 2010; their final concert was on 27 November 2010. During this time, there were plans for a new album, The New Adventures of Ch!pz, and a new single was in the works. But the management did not assume a new Ch!pz album would be successful, so future releases were cancelled.

The group members tried to legally acquire rights to the "Ch!pz" name, but were unsuccessful. They then disbanded on 1 January 2011, with the official announcement following on 3 January 2011.

=== Reunion ===
On 23 October 2018, the group reunited with the same members as before. They said they wanted to make a comeback in the music industry after an April fools joke that was well received by many fans.

=== Worldwide viral ===
In April 2022 (18 years later), Ch!pz went viral worldwide on TikTok with the song "1001 Arabian Nights". The song originally released in 2004 appeared in several videos on TikTok in October 2022 in which people performed a new dance to the song, in response to this, the pop group posted a video on 19 November 2022 on their account in which they performed the "old and new" dance to the song. This also went viral; their video was viewed more than 15 million times in nine days, and more than 2.6 million new videos with their song were posted on the platform in eleven days. This revival of the song made it reach the top spot on the Viral charts on Spotify in seven countries: Australia, Austria, Singapore, Sweden, Denmark, Finland and Poland.

== Members ==
- Rach-L (Rachel van Hoogen) - born 27 November 1983 (42 years old)
- C!lla (Cilla Niekoop) - born 11 December 1985 (40 years old)
- P3ter (Peter Rost) - born 19 April 1984 (42 years old)
- Kev!n (Kevin Hellenbrand) - born 14 February 1985 (41 years old)

=== Guest member ===
- Bram (Bram Blankestijn) - born 23 October 1986 (39 years old). Bram replaces Peter whenever Peter is unavailable to perform with the group. He is also the fiancé of C!lla.

== Discography ==
=== Albums ===
==== Studio albums ====
Title	Details	Peak chart positions					Certifications
Title	Details	NL	AUT	GER	SWE	SWI	Certifications
The Adventures of Ch!pz	Released: 4 February 2004; Label: Glam Slam / Universal	2	9	9	35	20	
The World of Ch!pz	Released: 11 March 2005; Label: Glam Slam / Universal	2	6	5	—	12	NVPI: Platinum
Past:Present:Future (Note: Past: Present: Future was split up in two parts, released as two separate EPs in the Netherlands. The first EP, called Past: Present: Future Part I, achieved a gold status but didn't chart on the Album Top 100. The second EP, called Past: Present: Future Part II, did chart and reached the 19th position, as listed here. In Austria, Germany and Switzerland the two EPs were released together as one studio album and charted as such.)	Released: 23 June 2006; Label: Glam Slam / Universal	19	29	55	—	73	NVPI: Gold
CDX (Ch!pz Dance Xperienz)	Released: 12 September 2008; Label: Glam Slam / Universal	39	—	—	—	—	
"—" denotes items which were not released in that country or failed to chart.

==== Compilation albums ====
Title	Details	Peak chart positions
Title	Details	NL
The H!tz Collection	Released: 4 May 2007; Label: Glam Slam / Universal	10
"—" denotes items which were not released in that country or failed to chart.

=== Singles ===
==== As lead artist ====
Title	Year	Peak chart positions									Certifications	Album
Title	Year	NL Top 40	NL Top 100	AUT	BEL (FLA)	GER	NOR	SWE	SWI	UK	Certifications	Album
"Ch!pz in Black (Who You Gonna Call)"	2003	2	1	2	40	2	19	3	2	—	NVPI: Platinum	The Adventures of Ch!pz
"Cowboy"	2003	1	1	1	37	1	—	3	2	44	NVPI: Platinum	The Adventures of Ch!pz
"Captain Hook"	2004	5	3	9	—	14	—	—	19	—	NVPI: Gold	The Adventures of Ch!pz
"1001 Arabian Nights"	2004	1	1	2	—	3	—	—	3	—	NVPI: Platinum	The World of Ch!pz
"One, Two, Three"	2005	1	1	31	—	40	—	—	47	—	NVPI: Platinum	The World of Ch!pz
"Carnival"	2005	1	1	28	—	28	—	—	32	—		The World of Ch!pz
"Gangstertown (Past-Present-Future)"	2006	5	2	22	38	34	—	—	58	—		Past: Present: Future
"One Day When I Grow Up"	2006	7	2	—	— (Note: "One Day When I Grow Up" did not enter the Ultratop 50, but peaked at number 13 on the Ultratip chart, which acts as an extension to the Ultratop 50.)	—	—	—	—	—		Past: Present: Future
"Christmas Time Is Here"	2006	8	4	46	—	73	—	—	56	—		Past: Present: Future
"Studio 54"	2007	8	7	—	—	—	—	—	—	—		Past: Present: Future
"—" denotes a single that did not chart or was not released in that territory.

- "Kung Fu Beat" (2004)
- "Moviestar" (2004)

==== Other appearances ====
Title	Year	Peak chart positions		Album
Title	Year	NL Top 40	NL Top 100	Album
"Als je iets kan doen" (charity single by supergroup Artiesten voor Azië)	2005	1	1	Non-album single
"—" denotes items which were not released in that country or failed to chart.
