= One, Two, Three (Ch!pz song) =

Single by Ch!pz

from the album The World of Ch!pz
- Released: 2005
- Genre: Eurodance
- Length: 3:13
- Label: Universal

Ch!pz singles chronology
"1001 Arabian Nights" (2004)	"One, Two, Three" (2005)	"Carnival" (2005)

"One, Two, Three" is a song by Dutch pop group Ch!pz. It's certified platinum by NVPI and reached number one on Netherlands Top 40 and 100.

== Charts ==
=== Weekly charts ===
Chart (2005–06)	Peak position
Austria (Ö3 Austria Top 40)	31
Germany (GfK)	40
Netherlands (Dutch Top 40)	1
Netherlands (Single Top 100)	1
Switzerland (Schweizer Hitparade)	47

=== Year-end charts ===
Chart (2005)	Position
Netherlands (Dutch Top 40)	53
Netherlands (Single Top 100)	6
