= 1001 Arabian Nights (song) =

Single by Ch!pz

from the album The World of Ch!pz
- Released: 6 November 2004
- Recorded: 2004
- Genre: Bubblegum
- Length: 3:07
- Label: Universal
- Songwriters: Tony Cornelissen; Allan Eshuijs
- Producer: Jay Vandenberg

Ch!pz singles chronology
"Captain Hook" (2004)	"1001 Arabian Nights" (2004)	"One, Two, Three" (2005)

"1001 Arabian Nights" is a song recorded by Dutch band Ch!pz, from their second studio album, The World of Ch!pz (2005). It was issued on 6 November 2004, as the lead single from the album. The song remained at number one on the Dutch singles chart for four weeks. It reached number two in Austria, and number three in Germany and Switzerland.

In November 2022, the song received renewed attention as a result of a TikTok trend.

== Music video ==
Filmed on location in India, the band travel to a Middle Eastern city where a magic lamp has been stolen by a thief who wished to become the richest man in the world. They battle the bodyguards finding the thief, and while Rachel and Cilla distract the thief that just turned a jester into a goat (who has wished to become the world's richest man) by dancing for him, Kevin and Peter steal the lamp and the band escapes. The city is then restored with the return of the lamp and the thief is arrested and been put away by the locals while the band bid farewell to the people.

== Viral on TikTok ==
In November 2022, Ch!pz went worldwide viral on TikTok with the song 1001 Arabian Nights. The song originally released in 2004 appeared in several videos on TikTok in October 2022 in which people performed a new dance to the song, in response to this, the pop group posted a video on 19 November 2022 on their account in which they performed the old and new dance to the song. They then went worldwide viral; their video was viewed more than 15 million times in nine days, and more than 2.6 million new videos with their song were posted on the platform in eleven days. This brought a revival of the song and it reached the top spot on the Viral charts on Spotify in Australia, Austria, Singapore, Sweden, Denmark, Finland and Poland.

== Charts ==
=== Weekly charts ===
Chart (2004–06)	Peak position
Austria (Ö3 Austria Top 40)	2
Germany (GfK)	3
Netherlands (Dutch Top 40)	1
Netherlands (Single Top 100)	1
Switzerland (Schweizer Hitparade)	3

=== Year-end charts ===
Chart (2004)	Position
Netherlands (Dutch Top 40)	74
Netherlands (Single Top 100)	11

Chart (2005)	Position
Netherlands (Dutch Top 40)	83
Netherlands (Single Top 100)	25

Chart (2006)	Position
Austria (Ö3 Austria Top 40)	13
Germany (Media Control GfK)	31
Switzerland (Schweizer Hitparade)	49

=== Decade-end charts ===
Chart (2000–09)	Position
Netherlands (Single Top 100)	45

== Certifications ==
Region	Certification	Certified units/sales
Netherlands (NVPI)	Platinum	60,000^{^}
^{^} Shipments figures based on certification alone.
