= Captain Hook (disambiguation) =

Captain Hook is the villain of J. M. Barrie's Peter Pan stories.

Captain Hook may also refer to:

== People ==
=== People with the nickname ===
- Sparky Anderson, former baseball manager
- Roy Jones Jr., American boxer
- Mike Sigel, American professional pool player
- Zavier Simpson, American basketball player

== Music ==
- "Captain Hook" (Ch!pz song), a song by Ch!pz from their album The Adventures of Ch!pz
- "Captain Hook", a song by John Cale from his album Sabotage/Live
- "Captain Hook" (Megan Thee Stallion song), a song by Megan Thee Stallion from her EP Suga

== Other uses ==
- Captain Hook (Once Upon a Time) (also known as Killian Jones), a character from the ABC television series Once Upon a Time
- Captain Hook's Pirate Adventures, a locally produced pirate-themed Christian children's TV show that aired on WHMB-TV in Indianapolis, Indiana from 1972 until 1993
