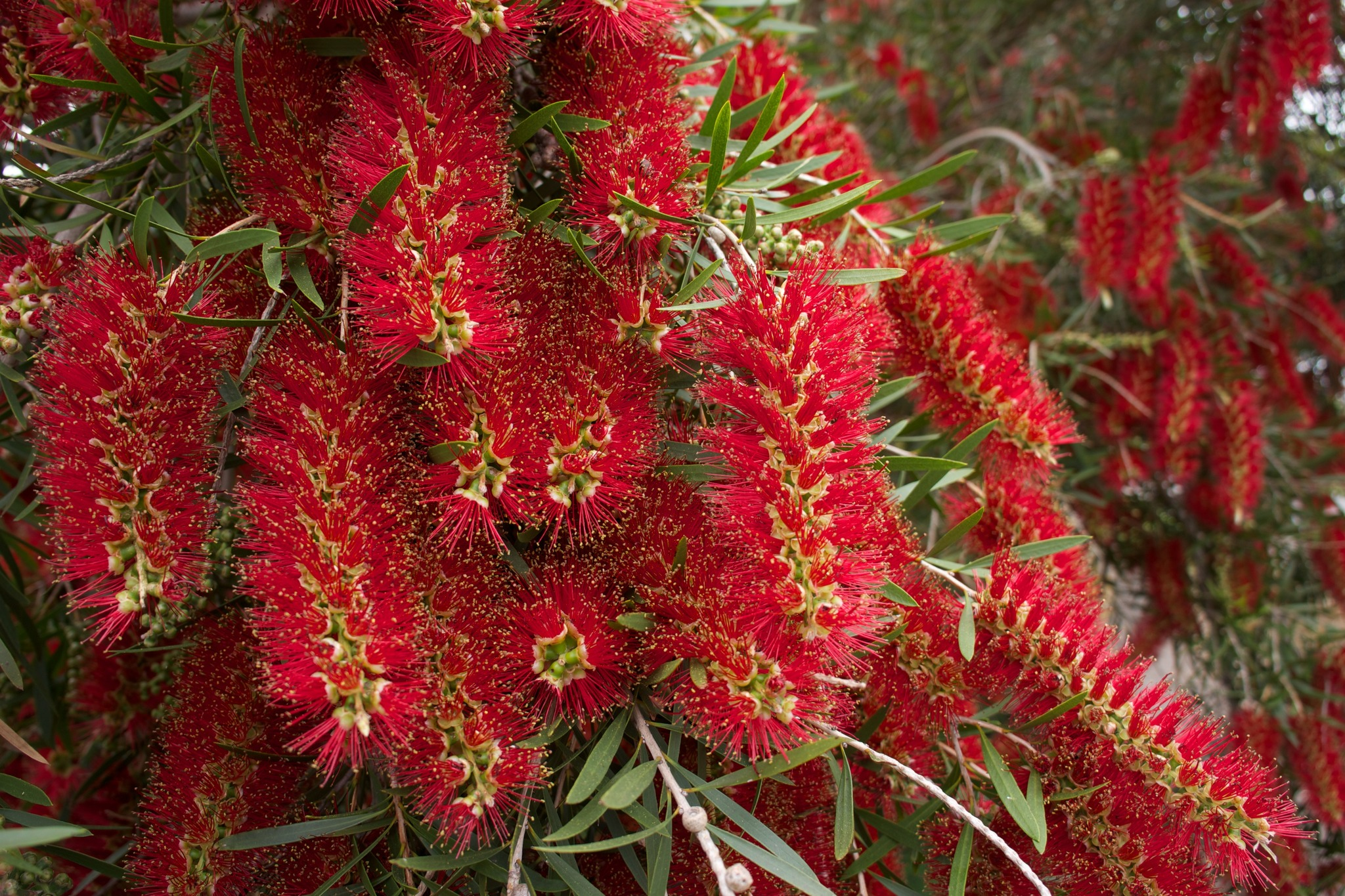

Conservation status
- Least Concern (IUCN 3.1)

Scientific classification
- Kingdom: Plantae
- Clade: Tracheophytes
- Clade: Angiosperms
- Clade: Eudicots
- Clade: Rosids
- Order: Myrtales
- Family: Myrtaceae
- Genus: Melaleuca
- Species: M. viminalis

Binomial name
- Melaleuca viminalis (Sol. ex Gaertn.) Byrnes

Synonyms
- Metrosideros viminalis Sol. ex Gaertn.; Callistemon viminalis (Sol. ex Gaertn.) G.Don

= Melaleuca viminalis =

Weeping bottlebrush

Species of flowering plant

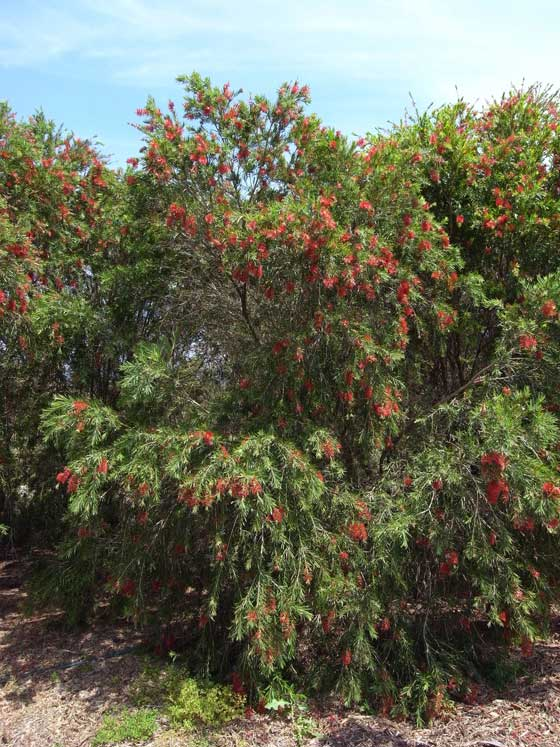
Habit in Mount Annan Botanic Garden

Melaleuca viminalis, also referred to as Callistemon viminalis in Australia (Note: Some Australian state and national herbaria continue to use the name Callistemon viminalis when referring to this species, and this name is also commonly used in Australian horticulture.) and commonly known as weeping bottlebrush, creek bottlebrush or drooping bottlebrush, is a species of flowering plant in the myrtle family Myrtaceae, and is endemic to eastern Australia but naturalised in other states and introduced to some other countries. It is a multi-trunked, large shrub or tree with hard bark, often pendulous foliage and large numbers of bright red bottlebrush flowers in spring and summer. It is one of the most commonly cultivated of the bottlebrushes, and its cultivars are often grown in many countries.

== Description ==
Melaleuca viminalis is a large shrub or small tree growing to 10 m (30 ft) tall with hard, fibrous, furrowed bark, a number of trunks and usually pendulous branches. Its leaves are arranged alternately and are 25–138 mm (1–5 in) long, 3–27 mm (0.1–1 in) wide, more or less flat, very narrow elliptical to narrow egg-shaped with the narrower end towards the base and the other end tapering to a sharp point. The leaves have a mid-vein, 9-27 lateral veins and large number of conspicuous oil glands.

The flowers are bright red and are arranged in spikes on and around the ends of branches that continue to grow after flowering. The spikes are 35–50 mm (1–2 in) in diameter and 40–100 mm (2–4 in) long with 15 to 50 individual flowers. The petals are 3.4–5.9 mm (0.1–0.2 in) long and fall off as the flower ages and the stamens are arranged in five bundles around the flower. The bundles are sometimes obscure but each contains 9 to 14 stamens. Flowering occurs from September to December and often sporadically throughout the year. Flowering is followed by fruit which are woody capsules, 3.8–4.8 mm (0.1–0.2 in) long and 5–6 mm (0.20–0.24 in) in diameter.

== Taxonomy and naming ==
This species was first formally described in 1788 by Joseph Gaertner, who gave it the name Metrosideros viminalis in De Fructibus et Seminibus Plantarum. In 1984, Norman Brice Byrnes transferred the species to Melaleuca as M. viminalis in the journal Austrobaileya.

In 2009, Lyndley Craven described Melaleuca viminalis subsp. rhodendron in the journal Novon, and the name, and that of the autonym, are accepted by Plants of the World Online:

- Melaleuca viminalis subsp. rhododendron Craven, a single-stemmed tree growing to 35 metres (100 ft) high, that flowers mostly in September and October, and occurs only in the Injune district in Queensland.
- Melaleuca viminalis (Sol. ex Gaertn.) Byrnes subsp. viminalis, is a multi-trunked shrub or small tree growing to 15 metres (50 ft) high and which often flowers throughout the year.

The specific epithet (viminalis) means "having long, slender branches".

The Australian Plant Census regards Metrosideros viminalis, Melaleuca viminalis, Melaleuca viminalis subsp. viminalis and Callistemon viminalis subsp. viminalis as synonyms of Callistemon viminalis.

== Distribution and habitat ==
This melaleuca occurs along the eastern part of Queensland from the Cape York Peninsula south to Moree and Grafton in New South Wales. The species has apparently been collected in Western Australia in 1991, but the Western Australian Herbarium considers the species "alien to Western Australia". It mostly grows in and along watercourses, mainly in sandstone or granite country.

Plants of the World Online records M. viminalis as native to New South Wales and Queensland, and introduced to The Bahamas, the Balearic Islands, California, the Canary Islands, El Salvador, Florida, India, Kenya, Madeira and Tanzania. It is considered a Category II invasive plant species in South Florida and Central Florida by the FISC.

== Ecology ==
Melaleuca viminalis provides food for nectivores. Its adaptations to survive strong currents during flood events allow it to slow the flow of floodwater and reduce erosion, thereby improving the water quality in streams and rivers. The matted roots of this species also strengthen the soil of riverbanks, further reducing the potential for erosion.

== Use in horticulture ==
A widely grown garden plant and street tree, usually known as Callistemon viminalis, the species is extremely adaptable in cultivation, flowering best in full sun but shade tolerant with reduced flowering, and growing in most soils. It is useful as a screening plant and is suitable for planting as a street tree. It needs regular watering but can survive drought as a mature plant although it is not frost hardy and will succumb to salt spray.

Many cultivars of this species have been developed as cultivars of Callistemon. They include:

- C. viminalis 'Captain Cook' - a dwarf, compact shrub 1–2 m (3 ft 3 in – 6 ft 7 in) high.
- C. viminalis 'Dawson River Weeper' – a fast-growing, rounded shrub up to 5 m (16 ft) high and wide with an exceptionally weeping habit.
- C. viminalis 'Hannah Ray' – a shrub 4 m (13 ft) tall and 2 m (6 ft 7 in) wide with scarlet brushes.
- C. viminalis 'Hen Camp Creek' – a shrub 3–4 m (9.8–13.1 ft) high and 2 m (6 ft 7 in) wide.
- C. viminalis 'Prolific' – a small, fast-growing tree, 4–6 m (13–20 ft) high and 4 m (13 ft) wide.
- C. viminalis 'Rose Opal' – a compact, dense shrub 1–5–1.8 m (3 ft 3 in – 16 ft 5 in – 5 ft 11 in) high.
- C. viminalis 'Wild River' – a semi-weeping form 4 m (13 ft) high and 2 m (6 ft 7 in) wide.
