= Callistemon 'Captain Cook' =

Cultivar of ornamental plant

- Genus: Callistemon
- Hybrid parentage: Seedling selection of Callistemon viminalis
- Cultivar: 'Captain Cook'
- Origin: Queensland

Callistemon 'Captain Cook' is a cultivar of the plant genus Callistemon, widely grown as an ornamental plant.

== History ==
The cultivar originated as a seedling of Callistemon viminalis. It was noted to have a more dwarf and bushy habit than usual and an abundance of flower buds as a young plant. Originally known and sold as 'Compacta', the name was changed to 'Captain Cook' to mark the 1970 bicentennial of James Cook's voyage to Australia. At a later stage, plants grown from seed were distributed under this name, and the true-to-type variety, which can only be propagated from cuttings became difficult to obtain.

== Description ==
Callistemon 'Captain Cook' grows between 1.5–2 metres (4.9–6.6 ft) high. It forms a dense, slightly weeping shrub. Leaves are narrow and 50 to 60 mm long.

A proliferation of red "brushes" are produced in spring, with further flowering sometimes occurring in late summer or autumn.

== Cultivation ==
Callistemon 'Captain Cook' is most suited to climates ranging from cool-temperate to semi-tropical.

A sunny position enhances flowering, and it performs best when it can be watered during establishment and in spring. It is adaptable to most soils, but prefers well-composted loam. Pruning after flowering helps to maintain the plant's shape.

The cultivar must be propagated from cuttings to maintain its original characteristics. Insect problems include leaf-webbing caterpillars and scale. A small amount of chicken manure or complete plant food applied in spring is also of benefit to growth.

== See also ==
- List of Callistemon cultivars
- Callistemon viminalis
