= Captain Cook (1826 ship) =

History

United Kingdom
- Name: Captain Cook
- Builder: Robert Campion, or John & William Campion, Whitby
- Launched: 1826
- Fate: Wrecked August 1843

General characteristics
- Tons burthen: 451, or 452 (bm)
- Length: 116 ft 0 in (35.4 m)
- Beam: 29 ft 9 1/2 in (9.1 m)
- Propulsion: Sail

Captain Cook was a merchant ship built at Whitby, England, in 1826. She made one voyage to Bombay under a license from the British East India Company (EIC) in 1828. She then made three voyages transporting convicts from Ireland and England to Australia. In August 1843 she was wrecked on her way with a cargo of coal from Shields to Aden.

== Career ==
On 6 July 1826, Captain Cook, Quickfall, master, sailed from Whitby for Quebec. She arrived there on 20 August, and cleared outward bound on 27 September.

Captain Cook first appeared in Lloyd's Register (LR) in 1827.

Year	Master	Owner	Trade	Source
1827	Willis. J.	Champion	Bristol–Quebec	LR

On 28 April 1828 Captain Cook, G.Willis, master, sailed for Bombay.

Year	Master	Owner	Trade	Source
1832	Willis, j.	Campion	London–New South Wales	LR

1st convict voyage (1831–1832): Captain William Steward and surgeon Eben Johnson, departed Dublin, Ireland on 5 November 1831. Captain Cook arrived in Sydney on 2 April 1832. She had embarked 200 male convicts and there were two convict deaths en route. Captain Cook left Port Jackson on 15 May bound for Launceston.

2nd convict voyage (1833): Captain William Thompson and surgeon John Morgan departed Portsmouth, England on 5 May 1833. Captain Cook arrived in Sydney on 26 August 1833. She had embarked 230 male convicts and there were four convict deaths en route.

Captain William Thompson died on 20 May 1834 and was buried at Calcutta.

3rd convict voyage (1836): Captain George William Brown and surgeon Arthur Savage departed Cork, Ireland on 5 July 1836. Captain Cook arrived in Sydney on 13 November. She had embarked 229 male convicts and had one convict death en route.

Year	Master	Owner	Trade	Source & notes
1836	Brown	Gordon & Co.	London–Hobart Town	LR; small repairs 1836
1838	Johnston	Gordon & Co.	London–Sydney	LR; small repairs 1836 & 1837
1839	Johnston	Gordon & Co. G.Willis	London–Sydney; London–Sierra Leone	LR; small repairs 1836 & 1837
1840	Johnston; W.Finch	G.Willis	London–Sierra Leone; Plymouth–United States	LR; small repairs 1836 & 1837, & damages repaired 1841
1842	W.Finch	G.Willis	Plymouth–United States; Scarborough–Shields	LR; small repairs 1836 & 1837, damages repaired 1841, & small repairs 1843

== Fate ==
Captain Cook, Finch, master, was lost before 21 August 1843. She was carrying a cargo of 700 tons of coal from Shields to Aden on behalf of the British government. She was wrecked on the coast of Africa 9 nautical miles (17 km) south east of "Burnt Island" (11.22°N 47.24°E). Midas rescued the crew.
