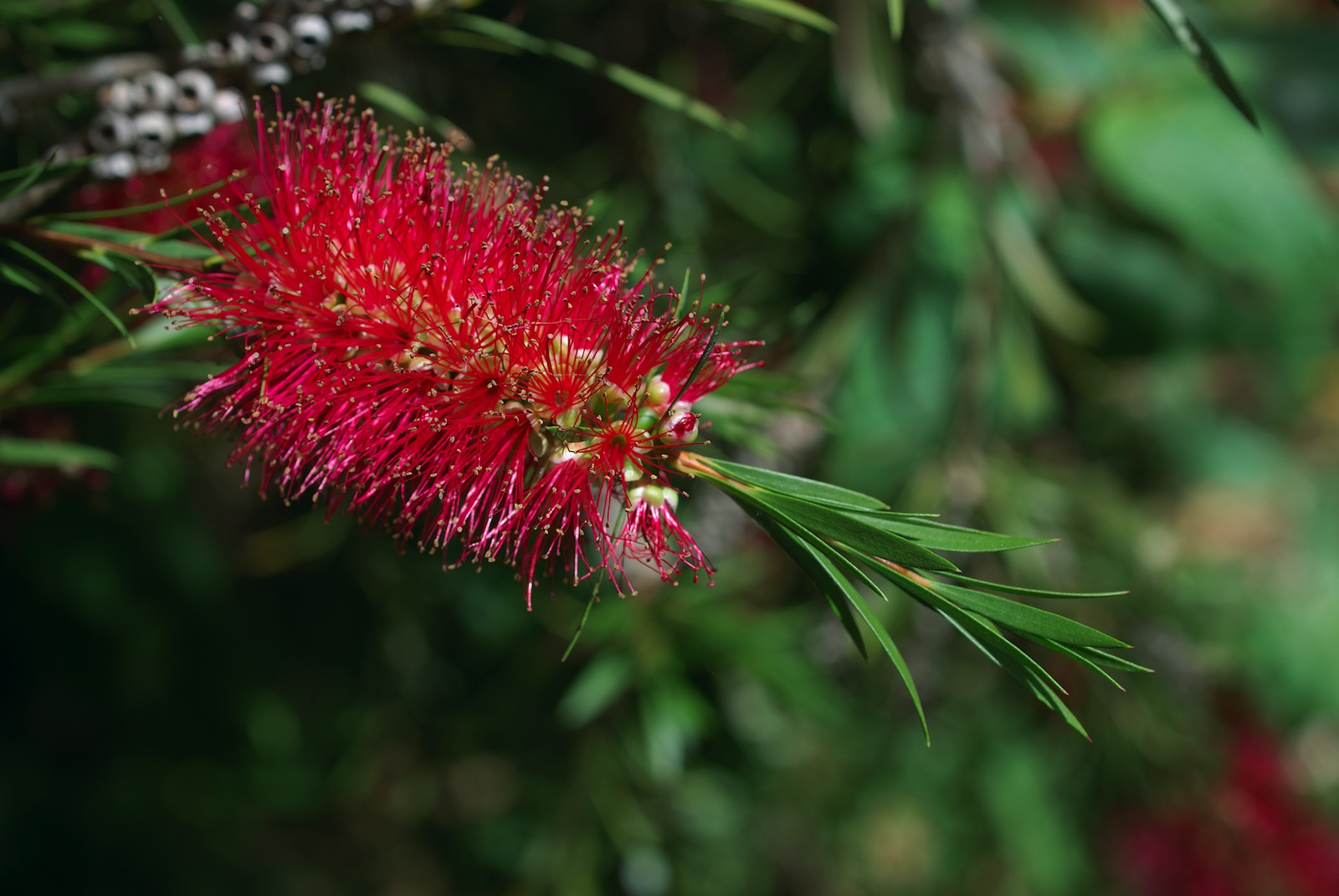

Scientific classification
- Kingdom: Plantae
- Clade: Embryophytes
- Clade: Tracheophytes
- Clade: Spermatophytes
- Clade: Angiosperms
- Clade: Eudicots
- Clade: Rosids
- Order: Myrtales
- Family: Myrtaceae
- Genus: Melaleuca
- Species: M. subulata

Binomial name
- Melaleuca subulata (Cheel) Craven

Synonyms
- Callistemon subulatus Cheel

= Melaleuca subulata =

Species of flowering plant

Melaleuca subulata is a plant in the myrtle family Myrtaceae, and is endemic to south eastern Australia. (Some Australian state herbaria continue to use the name Callistemon subulatus). It is a small, spreading shrub with hard bark, dense foliage, cylindrical leaves and spikes of dark crimson flowers in summer.

== Description ==
Melaleuca subulata is a shrub growing to 1–2 m (3–7 ft) high with hard, fibrous bark. Its leaves are arranged alternately and are 18–50 mm (0.7–2 in) long, 1–3.1 mm (0.04–0.1 in) wide, cylindrical or shaped like a bradawl.

The flowers are a deep crimson colour and are arranged in spikes at the end of, or around the branches which continue to grow after flowering. The spikes are 30–60 mm (1–2 in) in diameter and 40–80 mm (2–3 in) long with 20 to 80 individual flowers. The petals are 2.5–5.2 mm (0.1–0.2 in) long and fall off as the flower ages and there are 16-27 stamens in each flower. Flowering occurs from November to May and is followed by fruit which are woody capsules, 3–5.1 mm (0.1–0.2 in) long and 4–5 mm (0.16–0.20 in) in diameter.

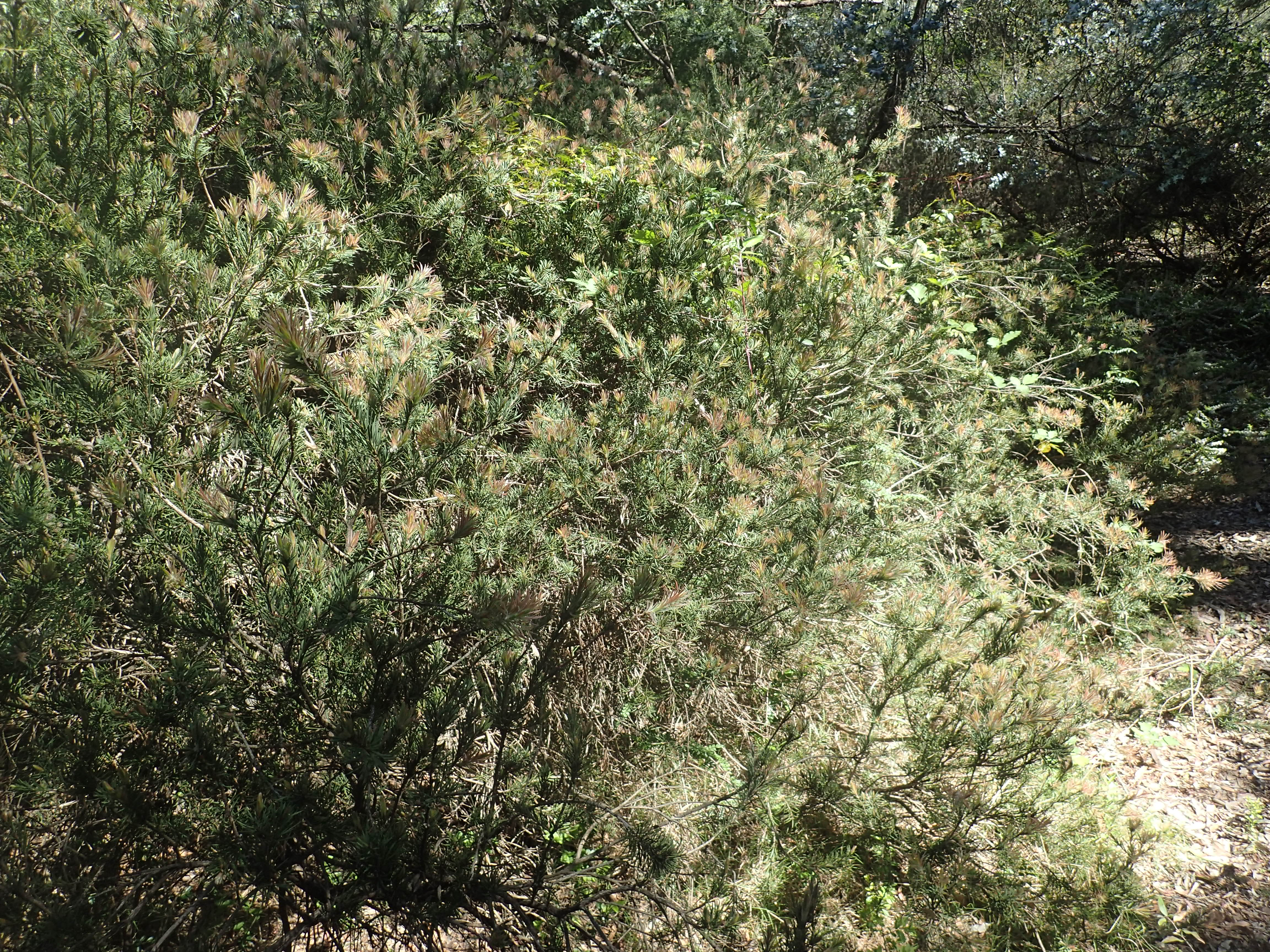
Habit in the Australian National Botanic Gardens

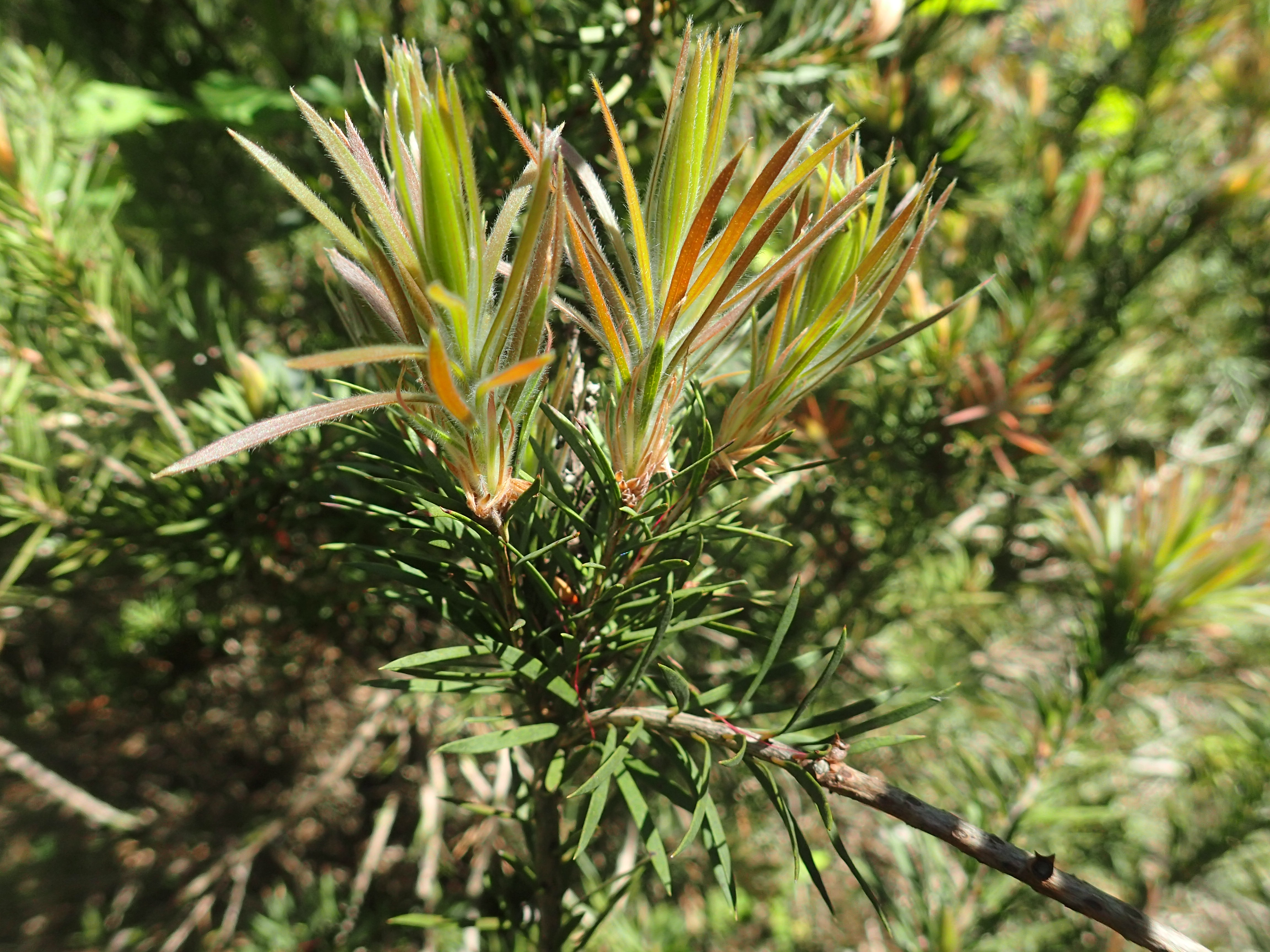
Foliage

== Taxonomy and naming ==
Melaleuca subulata was first named in 2006 by Lyndley Craven in Novon when Callistemon subulatus was transferred to the present genus. Callistemon subulatus was first formally described by botanist Edwin Cheel in 1925 in Proceedings of the Linnean Society of New South Wales Series. The specific epithet (subulata) refers to the subulate shape of the leaves.

Callistemon subulatus is regarded as a synonym of Melaleuca subulata by Plants of the World Online.

== Distribution and habitat ==
This melaleuca occurs in and between the Heathcote and Mittagong districts in New South Wales and East Gippsland in Victoria. It grows in creek beds and on the banks of streams in forests.

== Use in horticulture ==
Melaleuca subulata is commonly cultivated because of it abundant, attractive flowers. It is hardy but benefits from the application of low-phosphorus fertiliser.
