= The World of Ch!pz =

Studio album by Ch!pz
- Released: 11 March 2005
- Recorded: 2004–2005
- Genres: Pop; Children's music
- Label: Universal Music Netherlands

Ch!pz chronology
The Adventures of Ch!pz (2004)	The World of Ch!pz (2005)	Past:Present:Future (Part 1) (2006)

The World of Ch!pz is the second studio album by Dutch pop group, Ch!pz. It was released on 11 March 2005, in the Netherlands, and in 2006 in Austria, Switzerland, and Germany.

== Track listings ==
Dutch Version

1. "One, Two, Three!" – 3:29
2. "1001 Arabian Nights" – 3:06
3. "I Wanna See" – 3:16
4. "Kiss Me" – 3:46
5. "Rockstar" – 3:10
6. "Holiday!" – 3:04
7. "This Is How We Do It" – 3:28
8. "In the Game (The Football Song)" – 3:11
9. "It's So Easy (The Best Things in Life Are Free)" (feat. Jaggala) – 3:26
10. "Rhythm of the World" – 3:57
11. "Superhero" – 3:36
12. "The Happy Song" – 3:23

Bonus Tracks on Limited edition

#	Title	
13.	"Carnival"	3:46
14.	"Kung Fu Beat"	3:20
15.	"Moviestar"	3:52

EU Standard

#	Title	
1.	"One, Two, Three!"	3:29
2.	"1001 Arabian Nights"	3:06
3.	"I Wanna See"	3:16
4.	"Carnival"	3:46
5.	"Rockstar"	3:10
6.	"Holiday!"	3:04
7.	"This Is How We Do It"	3:28
8.	"In the Game (The Football Song)"	3:11
9.	"It's So Easy" (feat. Jaggala)	3:26
10.	"Rhythm of the World"	3:57
11.	"Superhero"	3:36
12.	"Kiss Me"	3:23

Bonus Tracks on Limited EU edition

#	Title	
13.	"The Happy Song"	3:23
14.	"Kung Fu Beat"	3:20
15.	"Moviestar"	3:52
16.	Ch!pz Desktop-Player (Computer Software)	
17.	"1001 Arabian Nights" [Video]	4:27

New Edition

#	Title	
13.	"Christmas Time Is Here"	3:53

== Charts ==
=== Weekly charts ===
Chart (2005–06)	Peak position
Austrian Albums (Ö3 Austria)	6
Dutch Albums (Album Top 100)	2
German Albums (Offizielle Top 100)	5
Swiss Albums (Schweizer Hitparade)	12

=== Year-end charts ===
Chart (2005)	Position
Dutch Albums (Album Top 100)	22
Chart (2006)	Position
German Albums (Offizielle Top 100)	92

== Singles ==
Name	Released	Writer	Producer	Chart position
"1001 Arabian Nights"	November 2004	T. Cornelissen, A. Eshuijs	Jay van den Berg	#1 (Netherlands), #2 (Austria), #3 (Germany, Switzerland)
"1001 Arabian Nights" is the first single off the album. It peaked at #1 in the Netherlands for four weeks and #2 in Austria for three weeks. It peaked for one week at #3 in Germany and Switzerland.
"One, Two, Three!"	February 2005	Thomas Heyerdahl, Jan Lindvaag	Peter Hartmann, Jan Langhoff	#1 (Netherlands), #31 (Austria), #40 (Germany), #47 (Switzerland)
"One, Two, Three" was released in Austria and Switzerland as the third single from the album in August 2006. Instead, "Carnival" was released as second of the album in the rest of Europe. In the Netherlands, it was released as the second single. In the Netherlands, it stayed at the #1 position for three weeks.
"Carnaval"	August 2005	Anderz Wrethov, Johan Deltinger, Elin Wrethov	Nick Manic, Mike Jaxx, Joy Deb, Linnea Sporre	#1 (Netherlands), #28 (Austria, Germany), #32 (Switzerland)
The song was officially the third single off the album in the Netherlands. There, it charted at #1 and stayed there for two weeks. In the rest of Europe, it was released as the second single from the album and was less successful.

Beside the 3 Singles, "Kung-Fu-Beat" and "Moviestar" got Single releases in 2004. "Rockstar" also got a Musicvideo.

=== Year-end positions ===
Year	Country	Peak
"1001 Arabian Nights"
2004	Netherlands	74
2005	Netherlands	83
"One, Two, Three!"
2005	Netherlands	53
"Carnaval"
2005	Netherlands	57
