= Past:Present:Future =

EP series by Ch!pz
- Released: (Netherlands) June 23 & November 17, 2006
- Recorded: 2006
- Genres: Part 1: Pop, children's music Part 2: Eurodance
- Length: 19:52 & 21:07
- Label: Universal Music

Ch!pz chronology
The World of Ch!pz (2005/2006)	Past:Present:Future (2006)	The H!tz Collection (2007)

Professional ratings
Review scores
Source	Rating
Free Record Shop	not rated link (in Dutch)

Past:Present:Future is a two-part album series by Ch!pz. In the Netherlands, Part 1 was released on June 23, 2006, and Part 2 was released on November 17 of the same year. They were released via Universal. The first album spawned two singles, "Gangstertown" and "Waikiki Beach", of which "Gangstertown" peaked at #5 in the Dutch Top 40 and "Waikiki Beach" wasn't officially released on single, just shooting a music video for it. In November 2006, the first album was certified Gold in the Netherlands for sales over 35,000. The second album came with a Bonus DVD in some stores like Free Record Shop and Van Leest. The official first single, "One Day When I Grow Up", was released in September and charted in the Dutch Top 40 at #29, and moved up to #7 in its second, third and fourth week. The second single, the Christmas track "Christmas Time Is Here," debuted at #8 in the Dutch Top 40 and remained there for two weeks.

== Part 1 ==
=== Track listing ===
1. "Gangstertown" – 3:13
2. "Waikiki Beach" – 3:23
3. "High School Love" – 3:16
4. "A Little Bit" – 3:14
5. "Olympia" – 3:33
6. "Veni Vidi Vici" – 3:13

=== Singles ===
Name	Released	Chart position	Tracks
"Gangstertown"	April 28, 2006	#5 (Netherlands), #38 (Belgium), #22 (Austria), #34 (Germany), #58 (Switzerland)	1. "Gangstertown" – 3:13; 2. "Gangstertown" (Instrumental) – 3:14
After being away for almost a year, Ch!pz returned with "Gangstertown" as the EP's first single. It's the only single from the EP that was released on CD.
"Waikiki Beach"	2006		
The song was a promotional single only. It was not released on CD like all former singles by Ch!pz. A music video was shot for it though.

=== Year-end positions ===
Year	Country	Peak
"Gangstertown"
2006	Netherlands	70

== Part 2 ==
=== Track listing ===
Disc 1 (CD)

1. "Studio 54" – 3:28
2. "One Day When I Grow Up" – 3:17
3. "Mama" – 3:46
4. "1929" – 3:29
5. "Walking on the Moon" – 3:14
6. "Christmas Time Is Here" – 3:53

Disc 2 (DVD)

1. "Gangstertown" [Video]
2. "Waikiki Beach" [Video]
3. "One Day When I Grow Up" [Video]
4. The Making Of "Gangstertown" [Video]
5. Photo Gallery
6. Photo Gallery

=== Singles ===
Name	Released	Writer	Producer	Chart position
"One Day When I Grow Up"	September 22, 2006	Eddy Zoëy, Ilona van Gelder, Jay Vandenberg	Jay Vandenberg	#7 (Netherlands)
The single was only released in the Netherlands. There, it was the first single off the EP.
"Christmas Time Is Here"	December 8, 2006	Nick Manic, Tom Nichols, Ziggy	Nick Manic, Ziggy	#8 (Netherlands), #46 (Austria), #56 (Switzerland), #73 (Germany)
In the rest of Europe, the song was released as the EP's first single. In the Netherlands, it was the second single.

=== Year-end positions ===
Year	Country	Peak
"One Day When I Grow Up"
2006	Netherlands	89
