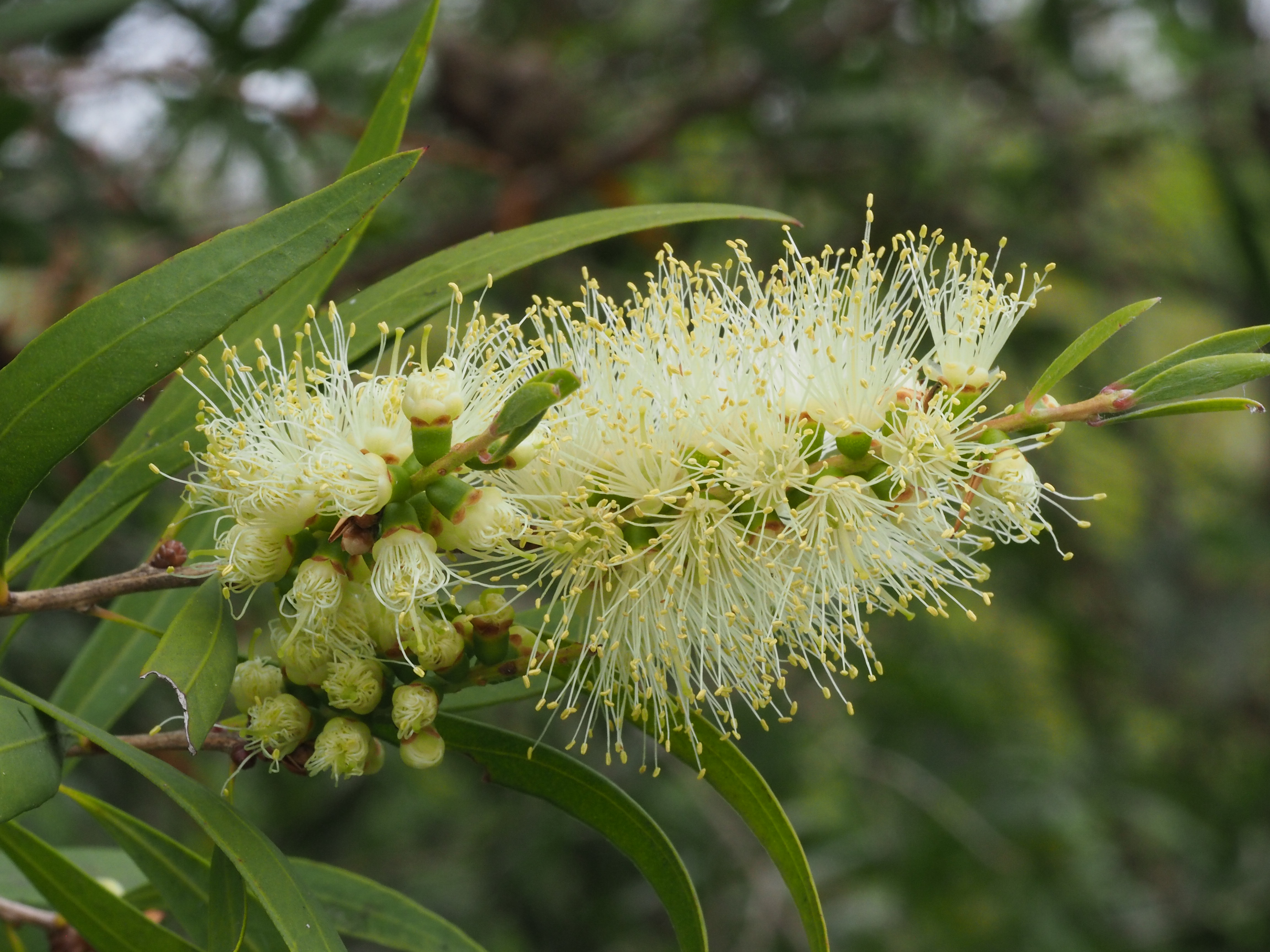
- Melaleuca salicina

Scientific classification
- Kingdom: Plantae
- Clade: Embryophytes
- Clade: Tracheophytes
- Clade: Spermatophytes
- Clade: Angiosperms
- Clade: Eudicots
- Clade: Rosids
- Order: Myrtales
- Family: Myrtaceae
- Genus: Melaleuca
- Species: M. salicina

Binomial name
- Melaleuca salicina Craven

Synonyms
- Metrosideros saligna Sm.

= Melaleuca salicina =

Willow bottlebrush

Species of flowering plant

Melaleuca salicina, commonly known as willow bottlebrush is a plant in the myrtle family Myrtaceae, and is endemic to eastern Australia. Some Australian state herbaria continue to use the name Callistemon salignus, a name that is accepted by the Australian Plant Census. It is a shrub or small tree with soft foliage, pink new growth, white papery bark and spikes of usually white or creamy bottlebrush flowers in spring.

== Description ==
Melaleuca salicina is a shrub or small tree growing to 15 m (50 ft) high with soft, pink new growth and white or grey papery bark. Its leaves are arranged alternately and are 38–144 mm (1–6 in) long, 5–16 mm (0.2–0.6 in) wide, more or less flat, narrow elliptic in shape and tapering towards both ends. There is a mid-vein, marginal veins and 9-29 distinct lateral veins.

The flowers are white or creamy-white and are arranged in spikes at the end of, or around the branches which continue to grow after flowering. The spikes are 20–35 mm (0.8–1 in) in diameter and 50–80 mm (2–3 in) long with 10 to 40 individual flowers. The petals are 2.6–4 mm (0.1–0.2 in) long and fall off as the flower ages and there are 48-65 stamens in each flower. Flowering occurs from September to November and is followed by fruit which are woody capsules, 3.8–4.4 mm (0.1–0.2 in) long and 4–5 mm (0.16–0.20 in) in diameter.

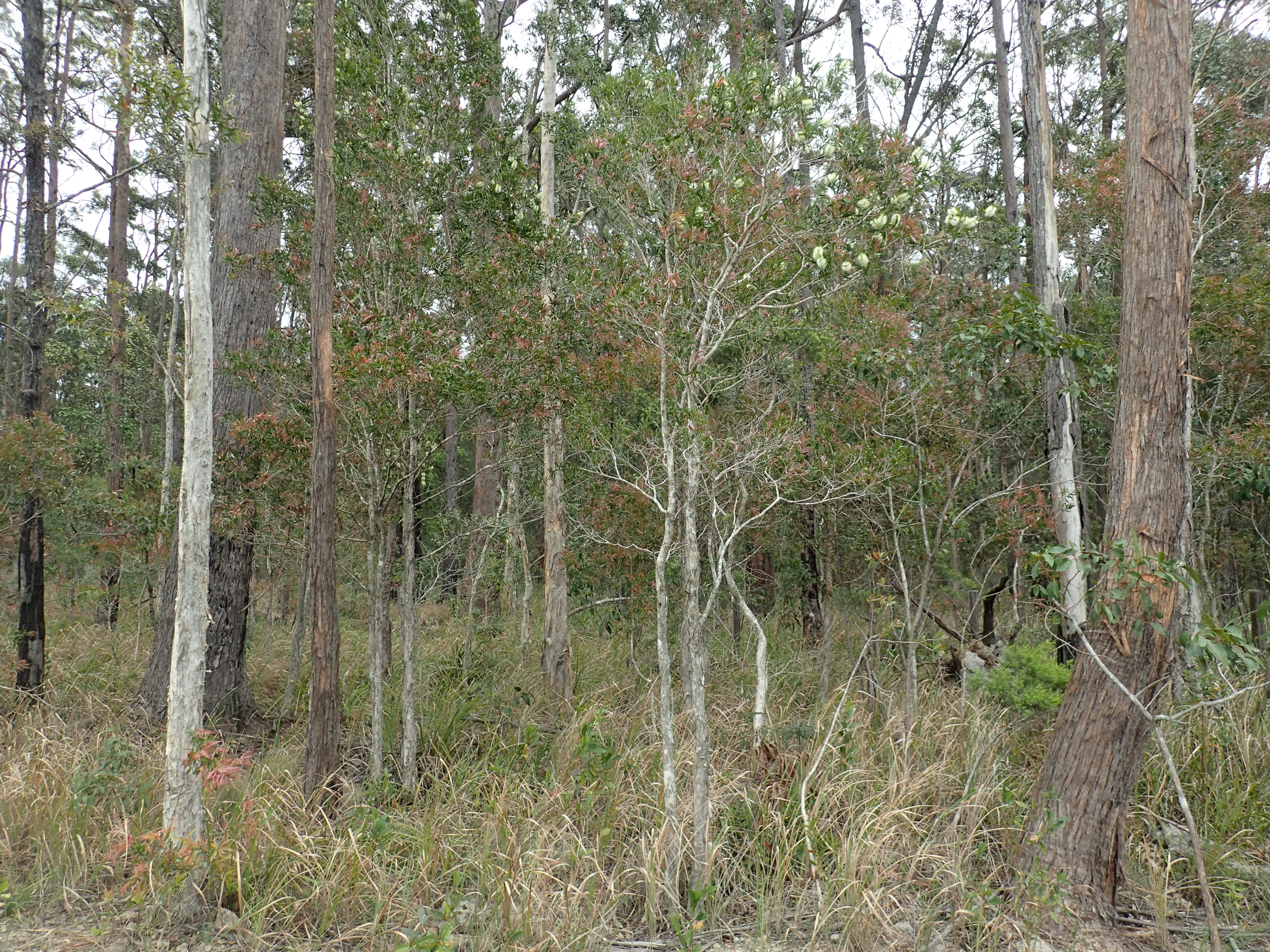
Habit in woodland near Moonee Beach

== Taxonomy and naming ==
This bottlebrush species was first formally described in 1797 by James Edward Smith who gave it the name Metrosideros saligna in Transactions of the Linnean Society of London. Then, in 1826, Robert Sweet transferred to the genus Callistemon in his Hortus Britannicus. In 2006, Lyndley Craven transferred the species to Melaleuca as Melaleuca salicina, a name that is listed as a synonym of C. salignus by the Australian Plant Census. The specific epithet (salicina) refers to an apparent similarity between the leaves of this species and those of a species of willow in the genus Salix.

Plants of the World Online considers the name Melaleuca salicina to be a synonym of Melaleuca lophantha (Vent.) ined.

== Distribution and habitat ==
This melaleuca occurs in New South Wales from the border with Victoria along the coast and ranges to the Biloela and Bundaberg districts in Queensland. It grows along watercourses and coastal waterways and on river flats .

== Use in horticulture ==
Melaleuca salicina has been known in gardens over many years, usually as Callistemon salignus. Under that synonym it has gained the Royal Horticultural Society's Award of Garden Merit. It can be used for providing shelter and screening and is well-suited as a street tree, or for planting in parks and gardens. Additionally, flowers will attract birds to a garden. The species is suited to a wide range of soil types, and can tolerate both wet and dry conditions and near-coastal exposure but it is not frost tolerant.

Pink and red forms are seen in cultivation.
