= The Adventures of Ch!pz =

Studio album by Ch!pz
- Released: 4 February 2004
- Recorded: 2003
- Genres: Pop; dance
- Length: 39:34
- Label: Universal

Ch!pz chronology
The Adventures of Ch!pz (2004)	The World of Ch!pz (2005)

The Adventures of Ch!pz is the debut studio album of Dutch pop group, Ch!pz. It was released on 4 February 2004, in the Netherlands. It was then released in 2005 in Austria, Switzerland, and Germany. As a result of the success of the album and its singles in several European countries near the Netherlands, they also started to release their singles in the Scandinavian countries in 2006.

== Track listing ==
1. "Cowboy" – 2:52
2. "Captain Hook" – 3:14
3. "Bang Bang" – 3:14
4. "Ch!pz in Black (Who You Gonna Call?)" – 3:02
5. "Say I'm Ur No 1" – 2:51
6. "Milky Way" – 3:14
7. "The Haunted House" – 3:18
8. "4 Who U R" – 3:57
9. "The Happy Hook" – 3:38
10. "Jungle Beat" – 3:08
11. "Slay Slay" – 3:28
12. "The Timeriders" – 3:38

== Charts ==
=== Weekly charts ===
Chart (2004–06)	Peak position
Austrian Albums (Ö3 Austria)	9
Dutch Albums (Album Top 100)	2
German Albums (Offizielle Top 100)	9
Swiss Albums (Schweizer Hitparade)	20
Swedish Albums (Sverigetopplistan)	35

=== Year-end charts ===
Chart (2004)	Position
Dutch Albums (Album Top 100)	17

Chart (2005)	Position
Austrian Albums (Ö3 Austria)	67
German Albums (Offizielle Top 100)	65

== Singles ==
=== Weekly charts ===
Name	Released	Writer	Producer	Chart position
"Chipz in Black (Who You Gonna Call?)"	2003	Peter Hartmann, Jan Langhoff	Peter Hartmann, Jan Langhoff	#2 (Austria, Germany, Netherlands, Switzerland), #3 (Sweden), #19 (Norway)
The first single released from the album was "Chipz in Black (Who You Gonna Call?)", which peaked at #2 in the Netherlands in 2003. In 2005 and 2006, the song peaked at #2 also in other countries it was released in, but never made the #1 position.
"Cowboy"	2003	J. Struik, R. Esseboom	Jay van den Berg	#1 (Austria, Germany, Netherlands), #2 (Switzerland), #3 (Sweden)
"Cowboy" was released as their second single and debuted at #1 in the Dutch Top 40 in 2003, topping the chart for 3 weeks, becoming their first number 1 hit in the Netherlands. In Austria, the single also topped the chart, making it their first and only single that has reached the #1 position there.
"Captain Hook"	2004	Nick Manic, Mike Jaxx, Ziggy	Nick Manic, Mike Jaxx	#5 (Netherlands), #9 (Austria), #12 (Germany), #19 (Switzerland)
"Captain Hook" was released as their last single of this album. The single ended up becoming the least successful single of the album, reaching a maximum of #5 in the Netherlands (staying in the chart for only 7 weeks), #9 in Austria and #19 in Switzerland.

=== Year-end positions ===
Year	Country	Peak
"Chipz in Black"
2003	Netherlands	18
2005	Austria	4
2005	Switzerland	9
2005	Germany	10
"Cowboy"
2003	Netherlands	48
2004	Netherlands	37
2005	Austria	24
2005	Switzerland	44
2005	Germany	34
"Captain Hook"
2004	Netherlands	89
