= Metribuzin =

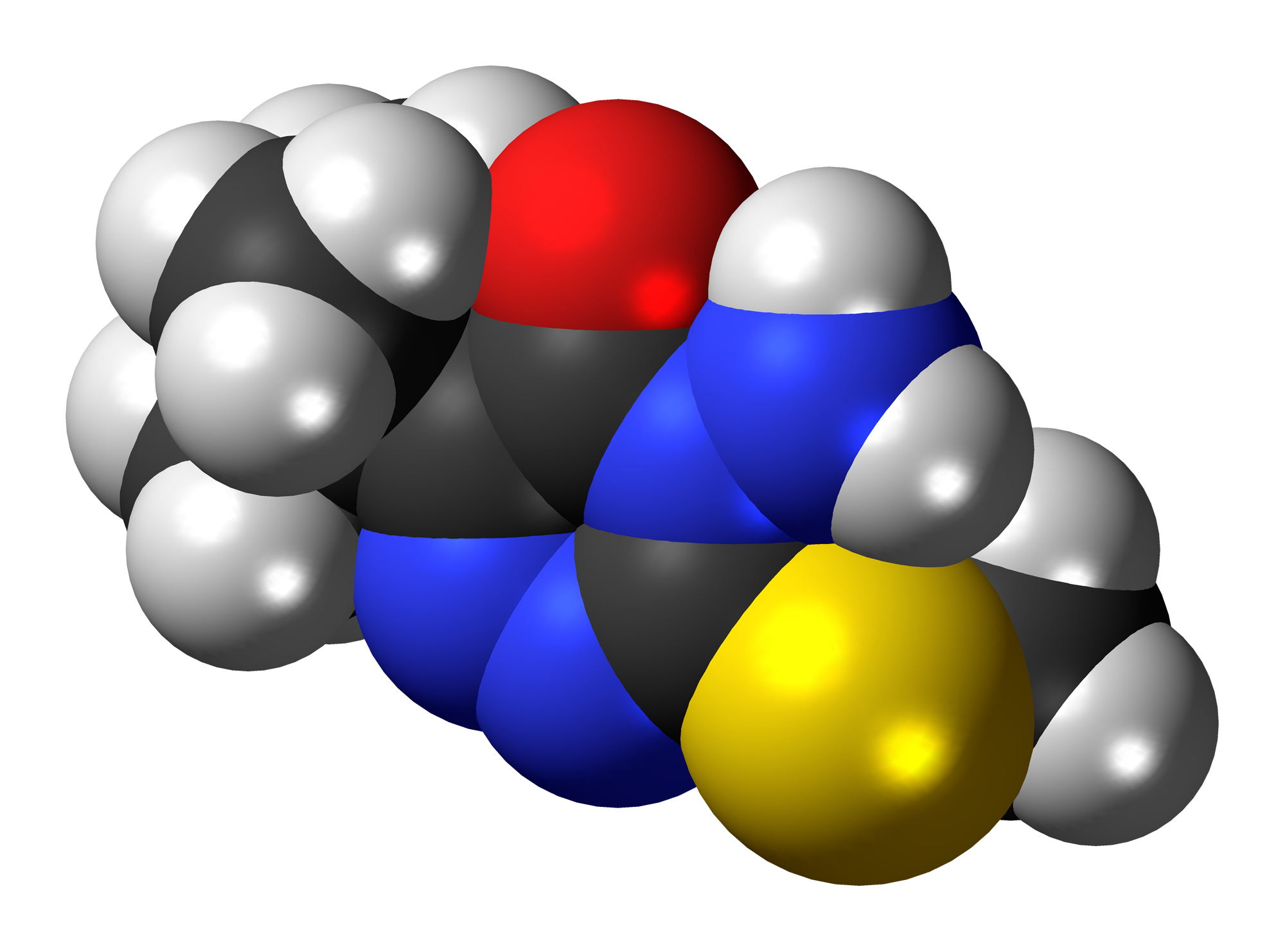

Names
- Preferred IUPAC name 3-Amino-5-tert-butyl-2-(methylsulfanyl)-1,2,4-triazin-5(4H)-one
- Other names 4-Amino-6-(1,1-dimethylethyl)-3-(methylthio)-1,2,4-triazin-5(4H)-one

Identifiers
CAS Number	21087-64-9
3D model (JSmol)	Interactive image
ChEBI	CHEBI:34846
ChemSpider	28287
ECHA InfoCard	100.040.175
PubChem CID	30479
UNII	QO836138OV
CompTox Dashboard (EPA)	DTXSID6024204
- InChI: InChI=1S/C8H14N4OS/c1-8(2,3)5-6(13)12(9)7(14-4)11-10-5/h9H2,1-4H3 Key: FOXFZRUHNHCZPX-UHFFFAOYSA-N; InChI=1/C8H14N4OS/c1-8(2,3)5-6(13)12(9)7(14-4)11-10-5/h9H2,1-4H3 Key: FOXFZRUHNHCZPX-UHFFFAOYAI
- SMILES: CC(C)(C)C1=NN=C(N(C1=O)N)SC

Properties
Chemical formula	C_{8}H_{14}N_{4}OS
Molar mass	214.29 g·mol^{−1}
Appearance	Colorless, crystalline solid
Density	1.31 g/cm^{3}
Melting point	125 °C (257 °F; 398 K)
Solubility in water	0.1% (20 °C)
Vapor pressure	0.0000004 mmHg (20 °C)

Hazards
- NIOSH (US health exposure limits)
PEL (Permissible)	none
REL (Recommended)	5 mg/m^{3}
IDLH (Immediate danger)	N.D.
- Except where otherwise noted, data are given for materials in their standard state (at 25 °C [77 °F], 100 kPa). Infobox references

Metribuzin (4-amino-6-tert-butyl-3-(methylthio)-1,2,4-triazin-5(4H)-one) is a herbicide used both pre- and post-emergently in crops including soy bean, potatoes, tomatoes, barley, chickpeas, faba beans, lupins, lentils, vetch, blade wheat and sugar cane.

It is registered for use in Australia, South Africa, (Note: In South Africa its registered crop uses are asparagus and soya beans.) and India.

== Mechanism ==
It destroys cells by inhibiting photosynthesis by disrupting photosystem II, which makes metribuzin's HRAC classification Group C1, Group C (global, Aus), Group 5 (numeric).

Herbicidal uptake in the plant is mostly by the roots, with some through the leaves. Metribuzin translocates upward, destroying cells. Symptoms on affected weeds occur in 7 to 30 days: chlorosis, followed by desiccation.

== Application ==
Metribuzin can be applied via a boom spray at 80 to 100 litres per hectare, and will be rain-fast after 6 hours. Moisture or rainfall within a fortnight improves its efficacy if used as a post-emergent; pre-emergent use requires soil incorporation (such as by a plough) within 12 hours. Recommended application rates go from 75 g/Ha to 380 g/Ha (0.067-0.34 lb/acre). It has been sold formulated as wettable granules, and can be compatibly mixed with glyphosate, trifluralin, diflufenican, chlorsulfuron, metsulfuron and pendimethalin. Anecdotally, a mixture with simazine is effective against wild radish.

It is effective against the weeds of capeweed, common cotula, doublegee, fumitory, Indian hedge mustard, toad rush, wild radish, wild turnip and wireweed, and can provide suppression only of brome grass, annual ryegrass and barley grass.

== Environmental behvaiour ==
It is widely used in agriculture and has been found to contaminate groundwater.

== Synthesis ==
Metribuzin is produced by reacting one mole of 4-amino-6-tert-butyl-3-mercapto-(1,2,4)triazin-5(4H)one and half a mole of dimethyl sulfonate which react at 57°C in presence of sulfuric acid media about 7 hours and transfer methyl (CH_{3}) from triazine to metribuzin and product formed 1 mole of metribuzin and half mole of sulfuric acid and later neutralized with soda ash and then purified.
