= Tri-allate =

Names
- Preferred IUPAC name S-(2,3,3-trichloroprop-2-en-1-yl) di(propan-2-yl)carbamothioate
- Other names: Triallate; S-2,3,3-tricloroallyl di-isopropylthiocarbamate; S-(2,3,3-trichloro-2-propenyl) bis(1-methylethyl)carbamothioate

Identifiers
CAS Number	2303-17-5
3D model (JSmol)	Interactive image
ChEBI	CHEBI:81978
ChEMBL	ChEMBL1884767
ChemSpider	5342
ECHA InfoCard	100.017.239
EC Number	218-962-7
KEGG	C18813
PubChem CID	5543
UNII	A9S097HS99
UN number	2588 (TRIALLATE, [SOLID])
CompTox Dashboard (EPA)	DTXSID5024344
- InChI: InChI=1S/C10H16Cl3NOS/c1-6(2)14(7(3)4)10(15)16-5-8(11)9(12)13/h6-7H,5H2,1-4H3 Key: MWBPRDONLNQCFV-UHFFFAOYSA-N
- SMILES: CC(C)N(C(C)C)C(=O)SCC(=C(Cl)Cl)Cl

Properties
Chemical formula	C_{10}H_{16}Cl_{3}NOS
Molar mass	304.65 g·mol^{−1}
Appearance	White crystalline solid or amber liquid
Density	1.27
Melting point	33.5 °C (92.3 °F; 306.6 K)
Boiling point	279 °C (534 °F; 552 K) 148°C also claimed
Solubility in water	4.1 mg/L
Vapor pressure	12 mPa

Hazards
- GHS labelling
Pictograms	(GHS07: Exclamation mark) (GHS08: Health hazard) (GHS09: Environmental hazard)
Signal word	Warning
Hazard statements	H302, H317, H373, H410
Precautionary statements	P260, P264, P270, P272, P273, P280, P301+P317, P302+P352, P319, P321, P330, P333+P317, P362+P364, P391, P501
- Lethal dose or concentration (LD, LC)
LD_{50} (median dose)	1700mg/kg (rat, oral); 930mg/kg (mouse, oral); 3500mg/kg (dermal, rat)
- Except where otherwise noted, data are given for materials in their standard state (at 25 °C [77 °F], 100 kPa). Infobox references

Tri-allate or triallate is a selective pre-emergent thiocarbamate herbicide, used to control wild oats and sundry grasses and broadleaf weeds, often co-applied with trifluralin, which is much weaker against wild oats than tri-allate. Residual control can be expected for 6 to 8 weeks. It is used in Australia, India and the United States. It was first registered in 1961.

In 2001, US agriculture used 2.3 million pounds (1,000 t) annually.

Tri-allate is a mitosis-inhibitor; its HRAC classification is Group J (Aus), Group K3 (global), Group 15 (numeric). Affected weeds are prevented from germinating, or their shoots will be swollen and bright green.

== Environmental behaviour ==
Under very dry conditions, tri-allate can persist in soil for several months, and can damage field oats and sorghum. Degradation is dependent on soil microörganisms and moisture levels. Tri-allate is nontoxic to birds and bees, though it is very toxic to aquatic life. It doesn't bioaccumulate in plants, and has low mobility in soil. The aquatic toxicity is most potent against invertebrates and algae. The EPA says "the overall ecological risk associated with the use of triallate is low".

The average soil half life is 82 days in "typical" conditions; it is also measured at 46 days, under "field" conditions. Similar half-life is seen in water sediment and in acidic (pH 9) solution.

== Properties ==
Triallate is synthesised from diisopropylamine, phosgene and 2,3,4-trichloro-phenyl-1-thiol. Its surface tension is 0.049 N/m, as a 90% solution at 20 °C. Monsanto manufactured it in the 1960s by the reaction of diisopropylthiocarbamate salt with 1,1,1,3-tetrachloro-propene. It is soluble in acetone, ether, ethyl alcohol, heptane, benzene, ethyl acetate and most organic solvents.

Diallate is almost identical, but missing one of triallate's 3 chlorine atoms. Unlike triallate, it has cis- and trans- isomers.

== Health ==
Exposure to large amounts of tri-allate may harm the liver, spleen and kidneys. The EPA considers tri-allate to be a possible carcinogen, the result being "borderline" statistically significant in a trial on mice, though their rough estimate is that the chance of cancer from dietary triallate is one in 14 million. This trial only showed an increased incidence of tumors in one measured category, in a sample size of 15. Diallate, a very similar herbicide, was carcinogenic, possibly prompting the concern for triallate.

In tests on rabbits, no fetotoxic or teratogenic effects were observed, although a small decrease of birth weight was strongly evidenced.

== Regulatory status ==
Tri-allate is limited to the US states of California, Colorado, Idaho, Kansas, Minnesota, Montana, Nebraska, Nevada, North Dakota, Oregon, South Dakota, Utah, Washington and Wyoming, as of 2023. In Australia, all states allow it to control wild oats and most allow its broader use in combination with trifluralin. It is used in the United Kingdom, Morocco and the EU states of Belgium, France, Ireland and the Netherlands.

== Application ==
It is incorporated to soil pre-sowing or (IBS) incorporated by sowing, and is applied immediately before or up to 3 weeks before sowing. It is recommended to incorporate it 2–4 cm deep, and within 6 hours if the soil is moist, or 24 hours if dry, to minimise volatilisation. Proper incorporation is essential for efficacy, and two-pass incorporation is needed for maximum efficacy. Efficacy can also be reduced if the top 2 cm of soil is very dry.

Tri-allate is applied at 0.8-1.0 kg/Ha (0.71-0.89 lbs/ac) in Australia, with a spraywater volume of 30 to 100 L/Ha (3.2-10.7 US gal/ac). Triallate is sold as an emulsifiable concentrate of 500 g/L active ingredient.

=== Compatibility ===
Tri-allate is compatible with spray mixes containing chlorsulfuron, diclofop-methyl, trifluralin, glyphosate and oryzalin.

=== Crops applied to ===
Tri-allate is applied to wheat, triticale, chickpeas, barley, peas, linseed, lupins, canola, faba beans and safflower. It was used on canary grass, but this registration was not renewed by the manufacturers, circa 2000.

=== Weeds controlled ===
Tri-allate is used to control wild oats, annual ryegrass, wireweed, phalaris spp, fumitory, cereal oats, sand fescue, silvergrass, wintergrass, paradoxa grass (canary grass), corn gromwell (sheepweed) and rough poppy. It suppresses brome grass, barleygrass, cornered jack (doublegee), caltrop (yellowvine & bullhead), yellow burr weed, deadnettle and speedwell.

=== Tradenames ===
Triallate has been sold as Avadex, Buckle, Far-Go, Showdown, Check Mate, Triallate Gold, Triallate and Tri-Allate.

== Links ==
- Tri-allate in the Pesticide Properties DataBase (PPDB)
