= Flamprop =

Weed control herbicide

Names
- Preferred IUPAC name 2-(N-Benzoyl-3-chloro-4-fluoroanilino)propanoic acid
- Other names: N-Benzoyl-N-(3-chloro-4-fluorophenyl)-DL-alanine

Identifiers
CAS Number	58667-63-3
3D model (JSmol)	Interactive image
ChEBI	CHEBI:82179
ChEMBL	ChEMBL1390805
ChemSpider	39044
EC Number	840-987-2
KEGG	C19052
PubChem CID	42807
UNII	3C7ST4DI17
CompTox Dashboard (EPA)	DTXSID1058137
- InChI: InChI=1S/C16H13ClFNO3/c1-10(16(21)22)19(12-7-8-14(18)13(17)9-12)15(20)11-5-3-2-4-6-11/h2-10H,1H3,(H,21,22) Key: YQVMVCCFZCMYQB-UHFFFAOYSA-N
- SMILES: CC(C(=O)O)N(C1=CC(=C(C=C1)F)Cl)C(=O)C2=CC=CC=C2

Properties
Chemical formula	C_{16}H_{13}ClFNO_{3}
Molar mass	321.73 g·mol^{−1}
Appearance	White crystals

Hazards
- GHS labelling
Pictograms	(GHS07: Exclamation mark)
Signal word	Warning
Hazard statements	H302, H315, H319, H335
Precautionary statements	P261, P264, P264+P265, P270, P271, P280, P301+P317, P302+P352, P304+P340, P305+P351+P338, P319, P321, P330, P332+P317, P337+P317, P362+P364, P403+P233, P405, P501
- Except where otherwise noted, data are given for materials in their standard state (at 25 °C [77 °F], 100 kPa). Infobox references

Flamprop is a selective post-emergent herbicide, used in Australia on wheat and triticale. It is an arylalanine. Flamprop comes in several chemical variants, including flamprop, flamprop-methyl, flamprop-isopropyl, flamprop-M, flamprop-M-methyl, and flamprop-M-isopropyl. The information in the right hand side box is accurate for basic flamprop.

Initial research focussed on wild oats in cereal crops in the 60s and 70s, with several chemical variants studied. Flamprop was introduced to the UK circa 1974, with variants coming a few years later.

In the 90s, Flamprop's recommended application rate was 600 grams active ingredient per hectare. In Australia, flamprop is sold as a 90 g/L concentrate, and applied at 112-225 g/Ha.

Under moderately basic conditions, the varieties of flamprop are hydrolysed to their base acids and alcohols. Under more basic conditions, there can be cleavage of the amide bond, resulting in benzoic acid and the corresponding amino acid.

By 2000, resistant wild oats (Avena fatua) were found in Canada, as well as oat species resistant to ACCase inhibitors and triallate, and difenzoquat. At the time, loss of oat crop and herbicide expenditure was estimated to cost Canada $300 million annually.

== Mechanism ==
All flamprop variants are HRAC Group Z or 0, as the mode of action is classed as unknown. It is suspected to be the prevention of cell elongation at the meristematic regions. Selectivity is possible because of differential metabolism, especially at the de-esterification, which is quicker in wild oats than in wheat and barley.

== Formulation ==
Flamprop formulations have long needed an oil based adjuvant for good performance. Originally, this was 30 to 36% naphthenic and 9 to 25% aromatic compounds in an emulsifiable concentrate. However, more adjuvant was needed than could be provided in concentrated formulations, so farmers were advised to add extra oil (sometimes sold as "Swirl"), though a 1994 study suggests the effect was small. Nonylphenol ethoxylates and allylamine ethoxylates were tested, and were worse or approximately equal to Swirl. The best adjuvants were Genamin C050 and Dobanol 25-7.

"Commando" was a 200 g/L formulation of flamprop-M-isopropyl.

== Variants ==
Flamprop Variants
Variant	CAS	Formula	Molar mass	Solubility
Flamprop	58667-63-3	C_{16}H_{13}ClFNO_{3}	321.73 g/mol	
Flamprop-methyl	52756-25-9	C_{17}H_{15}ClFNO_{3}	335.8 g/mol	35 mg/L
Flamprop-isopropyl	52756-22-6	C_{19}H_{19}ClFNO_{3}	363.8 g/mol	18 mg/L
Flamprop-M-methyl	63729-98-6	C_{17}H_{15}ClFNO_{3}	335.8 g/mol	
Flamprop-M-isopropyl	63782-90-1	C_{19}H_{19}ClFNO_{3}	363.8 g/mol	
Flamprop-M	90134-59-1	C_{16}H_{13}ClFNO_{3}	321.73 g/mol	
Flamprop-ethyl	34029-27-1	C_{18}H_{17}ClFNO_{3}	349.8 g/mol	13 mg/L
Benzoylprop-ethyl	34029-27-1	C_{18}H_{17}ClFNO_{3}	349.8 g/mol	20 mg/L

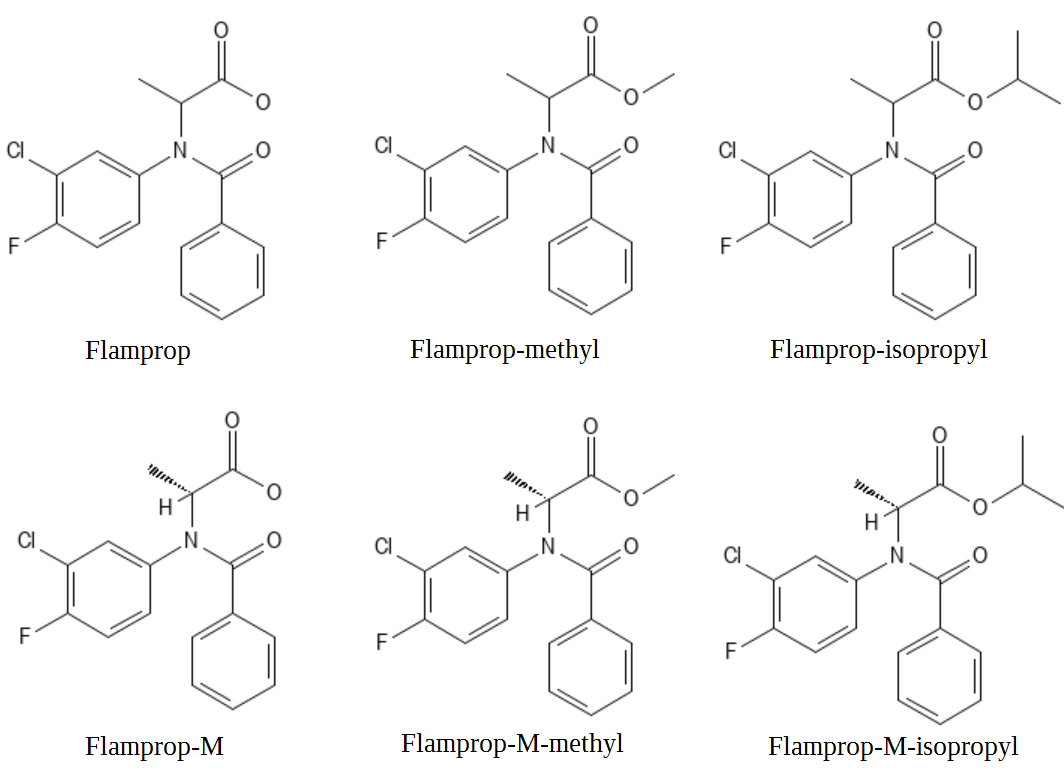
Flamprop's variants

Benzoylprop-ethyl is a closely related herbicide, which was studied in the same development program and first introduced in 1969, though it is now considered obsolete.
