= Tralkoxydim =

Names
- IUPAC name (RS)-2-[(EZ)-1-(ethoxyimino)propyl]-3-hydroxy-5-mesitylcyclohex-2-en-1-one
- Preferred IUPAC name (5E)-2-[(1E)-N-ethoxypropanimidoyl]-3-hydroxy-5-(2,4,6-trimethylphenyl)cyclohex-2-en-1-one
- Other names: tralkoxydime; tralcoxidime; 2-(1-(ethoxyimino)propyl)-3-hydroxy-5-(2,4,6-trimethylphenyl)-2-cyclohexen-1-one

Identifiers
| CAS Number | 87820-88-0 |
| 3D model (JSmol) | Interactive image |
| ChEBI | CHEBI:81948 |
| ChEMBL | ChEMBL60556 |
| ChemSpider | 17215911 |
| ECHA InfoCard | 100.122.974 |
| EC Number | 618-075-9 |
| KEGG | C18769 |
| PubChem CID | 91746; 135492483 |
| UNII | 39J71H3DDD |
| CompTox Dashboard (EPA) | DTXSID1034973 |
- InChI: InChI=1S/C20H27NO3/c1-6-16(21-24-7-2)20-17(22)10-15(11-18(20)23)19-13(4)8-12(3)9-14(19)5/h8-9,15,22H,6-7,10-11H2,1-5H3 Key: DQFPEYARZIQXRM-UHFFFAOYSA-N
- SMILES: CCC(=C1C(=O)CC(CC1=O)C2=C(C=C(C=C2C)C)C)NOCC

Properties
| Chemical formula | C_{20}H_{27}NO_{3} |
| Molar mass | 329.440 g·mol^{−1} |
| Appearance | White solid |
| Density | 1160 kg/cu.m |
| Melting point | 110 °C (230 °F; 383 K) |
| Solubility in water | 6.1 mg/L |
| Solubility in acetone | 89 g/L |
| Solubility in methanol | 25 g/L |
| Solubility in toluene | 213 g/L |
| Solubility in ethyl acetate | 110 g/L |

Hazards
- GHS labelling
| Pictograms | (GHS07: Exclamation mark) (GHS08: Health hazard) (GHS09: Environmental hazard) |
| Signal word | Warning |
| Hazard statements | H302, H411 |
| Precautionary statements | P203, P264, P270, P273, P280, P301+P317, P318, P330, P391, P405, P501 |
- Lethal dose or concentration (LD, LC)
| LD_{50} (median dose) | 6200 mg/kg (quail, oral); 1100 mg/kg (mouse, oral); >2000 mg/kg (rat, dermal) |
| LC_{50} (median concentration) | 3.5 mg/L (rat, inhalation, 4 hours) |
- Except where otherwise noted, data are given for materials in their standard state (at 25 °C [77 °F], 100 kPa). Infobox references

Tralkoxydim is a herbicidal chemical used in Australia and Canada postemergently to control annual ryegrass, wild oats, barnyard grass, foxtail and persian darnel in wheat, barley, rye, triticale and fodder, though it has no effect on broadleaf weeds. It was banned in the EU in 2019.

Tralkoxydim came out of Dow Agrosciences's patent in Canada circa 2009. It was first registered in Australia circa 1990.

== Mechanism of action ==
Tralkoxydim's HRAC classification is Group A (Australia and global) or Group 1 (numeric). Group A herbicides inhibit acetyl-CoA carboxylase (ACCase).

Tralkoxydim is absorbed by the weeds' leaves, thence moved through phloem to growing plantmatter where it inhibits the enzyme ACCase, which is needed for fatty acid synthesis. Hence tralkoxydim stops cell division and damages cell membranes, stopping the weed's growth nearly immediately.

Weeds affected by tralkoxydim show symptoms after 7 to 10 days, with purpling and yellowing shoots, and necrosis, and after 3 to 4 weeks, death.

Resistance has developed in some weeds in Western Australia, in about 10% of sampled wild oat populations.

== Application ==
Tralkoxydim is rainfast after 30 minutes or an hour. It is often supposed to be used with an adjuvant, at perhaps 0.5-1% of spray volume, and one such adjuvant is 50% mineral oil and 40% mixed surfactants. Crop injury can occur to non-tilled barley if temperatures fall below 40 °F (4 °C) within a couple of days before or after application, or if the crops are already stressed because of heat, drought or other reasons.

Tralkoxydim can be applied via ground equipment, at 300 to 500 grams per hectare (0.27 to 0.45 lb per acre) in a spray volume of 50 to 150 litres of water per hectare (5 to 16 gallons per acre); or by aerial application at 20 to 30 L/Ha (2.1 to 3.2 gal/Ha).

Tralkoxydim has been sold under the tradenames "Achieve", (Crop Care), Bison, (Adama), "Traction", (Tangyun), and "Tralkoxydim" (Apparent, 4Farmers, Nufarm, Smart).

== Safety ==
Tralkoxydim's acceptable daily intake is set by the EU at 0.005 mg per kg bodyweight per day, and the EU marks it with the GHS hazard statement No 351, "Suspected of causing cancer", though this statement is absent in safety data sheets from Canada or Australia.

== Ecological information ==
Tralkoxydim is not toxic to birds or bees. It may be toxic to aquatic life including algae (LC50 >5.1 mg/L), bluegill (LC50 >6.1 mg/L), and rainbow trout (LC50 >7.2 mg/L). Its average field half-life is about 2 to 13 days in aerobic conditions, but the water and soil persistence is high. It has low bioacculumative potential, and medium mobility in soil.
