= HRAC classification =

Herbicide classification system

The Herbicide Resistance Action Committee (HRAC) classifies herbicides by their mode of action (MoA) to provide a uniform way for farmers and growers to identify the agents they use and better manage pesticide resistance around the world. It is run by CropLife International in conjunction with the Weed Science Society of America (WSSA).

== Systems ==
There are three classifications: Australian, WSSA (also called Global) and Numeric. They all classify by mode of action, and their categories map mostly 1-to-1. For example, the Australian Group G is the WSSA's Group E, is the numeric Group 14.

These two systems were developed independently, and farmers got used to them. The WSSA's system took hold in Canada and the US, and is also called the "global" system, as opposed to the Australian system, which stayed in Australia.

In 2021, a numeric system was added, to make codes globally more consistent. This classification also added or reclassified some herbicides. It came due to confusion and reduced regional concerns that using the English alphabet could be too difficult for international growers.

== Resistance overview ==
A weed that develops resistance to one herbicide typically has resistance to other herbicides with the same mode of action (MoA), so herbicides with different MoAs, or different resistance groups, are needed. Preventative weed resistance management rotates herbicide types to prevent selective breeding of resistance to the same mode of action. By rotating MoAs, successive generations gain no advantage from any resistant mutations of the last generation. Cross-resistant and multiply resistant weeds resist multiple MoAs, and are particularly difficult to control.

There is limited evidence of resistance undoing other resistances. For example, prosulfocarb and trifluralin: their inverse mechanisms of resistance contradict, and so by evolving to one the weed loses resistance to the other, at least by metabolic resistance. Prosulfocarb requires a weed to metabolise it very slowly to survive; trifluralin on the other hand must be metabolised quickly before it can deal damage to the weed.

Resistance first became problematic in the 1970s and 1980s, and herbicide resistant weeds have developed against 23 of 26 known herbicide sites of action, and over 163 different herbicides. Herbicide development has slowed down significantly, with no new mechanisms being discovered from circa 2000 to 2020.

== Naming ==
Group Z is for an unknown mode of action until it can be grouped exactly. Groups J and Q are skipped (but not in the Australian HRAC) for confusion with I and O.

Herbicides that act through multiple modes have multiple classifications, corresponding to each MoA. For example, Quinmerac is classified as Group 4/29 (O/L) because it is both an Auxin mimic (Group 4 or O) and inhibits cellulose synthesis (Group 29 or L).

In the WSSA classification, there are related classes, with different mechanisms to achieve similar effect:

- C1, C2, C3: Photosynthesis inhibitors. Subclasses differ by behaviour at the binding protein.
- F1, F2, F3: Bleaching herbicides
- K1, K2, K3: Growth inhibitors

== Groups ==
HRAC Classification Groups
Group (AUS)	Group (WSSA)	Group (Numeric)	Mode of action	Example herbicides	Example chemical families
A	A	1	Inhibits acetyl CoA carboxylase	Haloxyfop-methyl, Clethodim, Sethoxydim, Pinoxaden	Aryloxyphenoxypropionates, Cyclohexanediones, Phenylpyrazolines
B	B	2	Inhibits acetolactate synthase	Imazamox, Chlorsulfuron, Pyrithiobac-sodium, Florasulam	Imidazolinones, Pyrimidinyl benzoates, Sulfonylureas, Triazolopyrimidines
C	C1 / C2	5	Inhibits photosynthesis at PSII - serine 264 binders	Atrazine, Simazine, Propanil, Amicarbazone, Bromacil, Diuron	Triazines, Amides, Phenlcarbamates, Pyridazinones, Triazinones, Triazolinones, Uracil, Ureas
C	C2	7 (merged into 5)	Inhibits photosynthesis at PSII	Isoproturon, Chlorotoluron, Tebuthiuron	Urea
C	C3	6	Inhibits photosynthesis at PSII - histidine 215 binders/uncouplers	Bentazon, Bromoxynil, Ioxynil	Benzothiadiazinones, Nitriles
D	K1	3	inhibits microtubule assembly	Trifluralin, Pendimethalin, Propyzamide, Dithiopyr, butamiphos, chlorthal-dimethyl	Dinitroanilines, Benzoic acids, Pyridines, Phosphoroamidates, Benzoic acids
E	K2	23	Inhibits microtubule organization	Carbetamide	Carbamates
F	F1	12	Inhibits phytoene desaturase	Diflufenican, Norflurazon	Phenyl ethers, N-Phenyl heterocycles
G	E	14	Inhibits protoporphyrinogen oxidase	Butafenacil, Carfentrazone-ethyl, Oxyfluorfen	N-Phenyl-imides. Diphenyl ethers, N-Phenyl-oxadiazolones, Phenylpyrazoles
H	F2	27	Inhibits hydroxyphenyl pyruvate dioxygenase	Isoxaflutole, Pyrasulfotole, Mesotrione	Soxazoles, Pyrazoles, Triketones
I	O	4	Auxin mimic	Dicamba, Halauxifen, Picloram, 2,4-D, MCPA, Triclopyr, Quinclorac	6-Arylpicolinates, 6-Chloropicolinates, Benzoates, Phenoxy-carboxylates, Pyridyloxy-carboxylates, Quinoline-carboxylates
J	N	8 (merged into 15)	Inhibition of lipid synthesis	Butylate, EPTC, Ethofumesate, Dalapon, Thiobencarb	Thiocarbamates, Benzofurans, Chloro-Carbonic-acids
K	K3	15	Inhibits very long chain fatty acid synthesis	Metolachlor, Pyroxasulfone,	Chloroacetamides, Isoxazolines, Thiocarbamates
L	D	22	PS I electron diversion	Diquat, Paraquat	Pyridinium
M	G	9	Inhibits 5-enolpyruvylshikimate 3-phosphate synthase	Glyphosate	Glycine
N	H	10	Inhibits glutamine-synthetase	Glufosinate-ammonium	Phosphinic acid
O	L	29	Inhibits cellulose synthesis	Isoxaben, Dichlobenil, Indaziflam	Nitrile, Benzamide, Alkylazine
P	P	19	Auxin transport inhibitor	Naptalam	Aryl-carboxylates
Q	F3 / F4	13	Inhibits deoxy-D-xylulose phosphate synthesis	Clomazone, Bixlozone	Isoxazolidinone
-	F3	11	Inhibits carotenoid biosynthesis	Amitrole	Triazole
R	I	18	Inhibits dihydropteroate synthase	Asulam	carbamate
-	-	28	Inhibition of dihydroorotate dehydrogenase	Tetflupyrolimet	
T	Q	30	Inhibits fatty acid thioesterase	Cynmethylin	Benzyl-ether
-	-	31	Inhibits serine-threonine protein phosphatase	Endothal	Other
-	M	24	Uncouplers	Dinoseb	Dinitrophenol
-	S / F3	32	Inhibition of Solanesyl diphosphate synthase	Aclonifen	Diphenyl ether
-	T	33	Inhibition of Homogentisate solanesyltransferase	Cyclopyrimorate	Phenoxypyridazine
Z	Z	0	Unknown	Flamprop-m, DSMA, MSMA, Pelargonic acid, Bensulide, Delapon, Napropamide	Arylaminopropionic acid, Others

Note: Several Group N (WSSA) / Group 8 herbicides have been rolled into Group 15, for example prosulfocarb, which has been a Group N / Group 8 but as of 2025, Group 8 does not appear on the global HRAC's list (linked here), and prosulfocarb is listed in a Group 15. (Australian Group J)

Note: Sources disagree on some classifications. This might be due to separation between the HRAC and the WSSA, updates and reclassifications.

== See also ==
- Insecticide Resistance Action Committee
- Fungicide Resistance Action Committee
