= Prosulfocarb =

Weed control herbicide

Names
- IUPAC name S-Benzyl N,N-dipropylcarbamothioate
- Other names Prosulfocarb, A8545C

Identifiers
CAS Number	52888-80-9
3D model (JSmol)	Interactive image
ChEBI	CHEBI:81941
ChEMBL	ChEMBL2251843
ChemSpider	55867
ECHA InfoCard	100.100.363
EC Number	401-730-6
KEGG	C18760
PubChem CID	62020
UNII	8VCE6FU50D
UN number	3082 (CARBAMOTHIOIC ACID, DIPROPYL-, S-(PHENYLMETHYL) ESTER)
CompTox Dashboard (EPA)	DTXSID3058119
- InChI: InChI=1S/C14H21NOS/c1-3-10-15(11-4-2)14(16)17-12-13-8-6-5-7-9-13/h5-9H,3-4,10-12H2,1-2H3 Key: NQLVQOSNDJXLKG-UHFFFAOYSA-N
- SMILES: CCCN(CCC)C(=O)SCC1=CC=CC=C1

Properties
Chemical formula	C_{14}H_{21}NOS
Molar mass	251.39 g·mol^{−1}
Appearance	Colourless - pale yellow
Odor	Aromatic
Density	1049 kg/m^{3}
Melting point	-20 °C
Boiling point	341 °C
Solubility in water	Insoluble
Solubility in xylene	Soluble
Solubility in acetone	Soluble
Solubility in heptane	Soluble
Solubility in ethyl acetate	Soluble
Vapor pressure	0.79 mPa

Hazards
- GHS labelling
Pictograms	(GHS08: Health hazard) (GHS09: Environmental hazard)
Signal word	Warning
Hazard statements	H227, H302, H317, H335, H371, H373, H401
Precautionary statements	P261, P264, P270, P272, P273, P280, P301+P317, P302+P352, P321, P330, P333+P317, P362+P364, P391, P501
Flash point	167.1 °C
- Except where otherwise noted, data are given for materials in their standard state (at 25 °C [77 °F], 100 kPa). Infobox references

Prosulfocarb is a preëmergent herbicide used agriculturally in Australia, the EU, Japan, New Zealand, (since 2020), Morocco and Iran, for control of annual ryegrass and toad rush in wheat and barley crops. It was introduced to the EU in 1988 and is rapidly growing in use, with sales increasing by over 500% in France since 2008.

Prosulfocarb is a thiocarbamate, and is absorbed by the roots of germinating seedlings to inhibit growth in the meristem by inhibiting fat synthesis, of resistance HRAC Group J, (Aus), Group N, (WSSA), Group 8. (8 merged into Group 15) (numeric) Applying prosulfocarb repeatedly builds weed resistance but undoes trifluralin (Group 3) resistance, as they have opposing mechanisms: prosulfocarb is resisted by decreasing pesticide metabolism; trifluralin is resisted by increasing metabolism.

== Application ==
To target annual ryegrass, 2.5 L/ha (of 800 g/L emulsifiable concentrate) is prepared and sprayed before sowing. It can be applied to barley post-emergence, but if applied wrongly may cause crop damage. Prosulfocarb does not need much moisture to be applied efficably, due to low volatility.

Prosulfocarb is often applied alongside s-metolachlor and pyroxasulfone, or in Australia with trifluralin, with which it more efficiently circumvents weed resistance.

Prosulfocarb prevents target weeds from germinating, or failing that, the shoots grow swollen and bright green.

== Toxicology ==
Prosulfocarb's LD_{50} toxicity is 1820 mg/kg orally for rats, which is comparable to paracetamol. The human toxicological effect is low. Prosulfocarb itself is not a combustible, but formulations can be due to other components. (e.g. solvent naphtha) Prosulfocarb is an irritant.

What limited mammalian toxicity exists, seems to affect the liver and kidneys, and in long-term studies, reduces appetite. Evidence does not show any carcinogenicity or genotoxicity. No toxic effect on the reproduction is shown. Prosulfocarb may have weak teratogenic potential, though there is no convincing evidence for it.

== Environmental effect ==
Prosulfocarb is toxic to aquatic organisms; it is mandatory in Australia not to spray it within 20 metres upwind of aquatic or wetland areas or to apply by air. Nor if heavy rain is expected, to prevent runoff. It is not persistent in soil, with a halflife of 35 days. Prosulfocarb bioaccumulates, and has slight mobility in soil. Prosulfocarb's halflife in water (measured in ditches) is only 2.9 days.

Prosulfocarb was detectable in 97% of beeswax samples in a Swiss study, to a maximum level of 21 μg/kg, and was detectable in 27% of pollen.

== Production ==
Global herbicide production is in TGAC form, typically 95-98% purity, whence it is shipped and locally formulated into commercially practical formulations, a mix with a solvent such as solvent naptha and other agents to make good mixing behaviour. Tech production is often in the USA, Japan, China, and India, the top four global agrochemical producers. Hermani, in Bharuch, India, has the capacity for 5000 tonnes of technical per year; Punjab Chemicals, in Dera Bassi, another 3000; Weifang Sino-Agri, China, another 1000 tonnes per year.

=== Synthesis ===
Prosulfocarb is synthesised by combination of dipropyl amine and phosgene, the amine replacing a chlorine atom, and this is then combined with benzyl mercaptan which takes the place of phosgene's other chlorine atom. The other order, adding the mercaptan to phosgene first, is also possible.

== Uses ==
Target weeds

Prosulfocarb has been used to control the following weeds: annual ryegrass, Lolium rigidum, which is highly resistant to other herbicides, notably glyphosate, barley grass, toad rush, red and white fumitory, paradoxa grass (canary grass), Phalaris spp., sand fescue, silver grass (Vulpia spp.), soil surface wild oats, wireweed (hogweed), suppression of brome grass, deadnettle, rough poppy and yellow burr weed.

Crops

Prosulfocarb has been applied to the following crops: wheat and barley, and experimentally, in China on faba beans.

Tradenames

Prosulfocarb has been sold under these tradenames: Prosulfocarb 800, (4Famers, Genfarm, Reylon), Profuse, Arcade, (Syngenta), Countdown, Boxer Gold, (combination with s-Metolachlor), Defi, and Dian.

== Links ==
- Prosulfocarb in the Pesticide Properties DataBase (PPDB)
