= Tetflupyrolimet =

Weed control herbicide

Names
- Preferred IUPAC name (3S,4S)-N-(2-fluorophenyl)-1-methyl-2-oxo-4-[3-(trifluoromethyl)phenyl]pyrrolidine-3-carboxamide
- Other names: (3S,4S)-2′-fluoro-1-methyl-2-oxo-4-[3-(trifluoromethyl)phenyl]pyrrolidine-3-carboxanilide; (3S,4S)-N-(2-fluorophenyl)-1-methyl-2-oxo-4-[3-(trifluoromethyl)phenyl]-3-pyrrolidinecarboxamide; TVE29

Identifiers
CAS Number	2053901-33-8
3D model (JSmol)	Interactive image
ChEBI	CHEBI:191391
ChemSpider	71078725
EC Number	883-759-8
PubChem CID	124107648
UNII	35TNH7DYF2
CompTox Dashboard (EPA)	DTXSID401337343
- InChI: InChI=1S/C19H16F4N2O2/c1-25-10-13(11-5-4-6-12(9-11)19(21,22)23)16(18(25)27)17(26)24-15-8-3-2-7-14(15)20/h2-9,13,16H,10H2,1H3,(H,24,26)/t13-,16+/m1/s1 Key: QQDYOLJZDUADHV-CJNGLKHVSA-N
- SMILES: CN1C[C@@H]([C@H](C1=O)C(=O)NC2=CC=CC=C2F)C3=CC(=CC=C3)C(F)(F)F

Properties
Chemical formula	C_{19}H_{16}F_{4}N_{2}O_{2}
Molar mass	380.343 g·mol^{−1}
Appearance	Off-white to pink solid
Density	1417 kg/m^{3}
Melting point	138 °C (280 °F; 411 K)
Boiling point	NA, decomposes at 380°C
Solubility in water	4.7 mg/L
Vapor pressure	0.048 nPa
Acidity (pK_{a})	12.8

Hazards
- Lethal dose or concentration (LD, LC)
LD_{50} (median dose)	>5000 mg/kg (oral); >2000 mg/kg (dermal)
- Except where otherwise noted, data are given for materials in their standard state (at 25 °C [77 °F], 100 kPa). Infobox references

Tetflupyrolimet is an anilide herbicide for controlling grass weeds. It was launched in 2020, and its novel mode of action makes it the first HRAC Group 28 herbicide, and the first new herbicidal mode of action discovered in some 30 years, after Group 27 and Group 10.

== Discovery ==
New effort to research herbicides has taken place recently, following a decades dearth of development, and growing problems with herbicide resistance. Mitsui developed cyclopyrimorate, the first Group 33, at around the same time.

Tetflupyrolimet was discovered by FMC researchers doing high-volume screening in greenhouse testing. One vendor-supplied chemical, 4-phenylpyrrolidinone-5-anilide, looked promising. It made no chlorotic symptoms, but suppressed grass growth. Known modes of action were ruled out. The vendor however, supplied the wrong chemical. The promising sample had was -3-anilide, not -5-anilide. The 'correct' chemical, when re-created, had no herbicidal activity. The incorrect chemical sparked a slew of new experiments.

Candidate pyrrolidinone amides were studied; generally stronger against grasses than broadleaf weeds, and had more effect preëmergently than post. Initial efforts focused on additions to the phenyl rings, with fluorine tested in several positions, analogs with other halogens like methyl and trifluoromethyl being generally less potent than fluorine on the 3-anilide ring. On the 4-phenul ring the analogs had pronounced, varied effects, with trifluoromethyl, trifluoromethoxy and halogen substitution at the 3 or 4 positions boosting efficacy. The free NH group by the anilide group proved crucial; its hydrogen being methyl-substituted negated activity. Selective control in rice drew researchers to the 4-phenyl trifluoromethyl analog, with the fluorine still in the ortho position on the anilide ring, as it was efficacious and crop-safe. Testing revealed a racemic mixture was inefficient, one enantiomer was providing all the activity. Methylating the lactam-ring isomer also strengthened activity. The central pyrrolidinone ring was replaced experimentally, but all were less effective (some completely ineffective) and some caused crop-damage.

Field trials in Japan, Indonesia, India, Vietnam, Brazil and the USA came back promising for rice use. The MoA was patented in 2017.

== Mechanism ==
Tetflupyrolimet's mode of action is inhibition of the enzyme dihydroorotate dehydrogenase (DHODH), disrupting the de novo pyrimidine biosynthesis pathway. Pyrimidine is used for DNA/RNA synthesis and metabolising things such as polysaccharides and glycoproteins. Plant cells also make pyrimidine through a salvage process of cellular components (like RNA), and this is energetically cheap, but when the plant needs large amounts of pyrimidine, such as when growing or rapidly dividing, it must use the de novo process, which DHODH catalyses at step 4, so by targeting this, tetflupyrolimet is most active against seedlings. Blocking pyrimidine formation then, halts growth and emergence. Despite halted growth, there are no symptoms of chlorosis, but stunted groweth and dark and purple pigmentation and necrosis. Roots are more affected by altered pyrimidine biosynthesis, and may suffer greatly even while the aboveground portion looks fine. Weeds usually die within 7 to 10 days of symptoms.

DHODH converts dihydroorotate to orotate, and is mediated by ubiquinone. Tetflupyrolimet's effects can be undone by adding orotate, or the later product uridine monophosphate, directly.

Tetflupyrolimet is rapidly absorbed by roots and shoots, is mobile in xylem and remains chemically stable in the plant. It forms an active layer on the surface of the soil, and is drawn by soil moisture into seedlings as they grow into the treated layer. Postemergent use also involves some foliar uptake.

== Environmental behaviour ==
Tetflupyrolimet has a half life in soil of 64 days (lab tests). The 96 hour LC_{50} for fish is 5.9 mg/L and is similar for daphnia and algae. The LC_{50} for earthworms is >1000 mg/kg dry weight of soil; the oral LD_{50} for birds is >2000 mg/kg, and the contact LD_{50} for bees is >100 μg per bee.

== Usage ==
Tetflupyrolimet has been tradenamed "Dodhylex" by FMC corporation, who discovered it. As of November 2024, Dodhylex is not registed in any country, however registration documents have been submitted in the US, Brazil, Colombia, Korea, India, Peru, the Philippines and Taiwan, and FMC plans to register it in all major rice farming nations, and maybe for other crops too. They expect the application rates to be 70 to 250 g/Ha active ingredient, applied by 0.5-1% a.i. granules or a 400 g/L a.i. suspension concentrate, which requires constant agitation in spraying equipment.

Tetflupyrolimet has been experimentally used on rice, sugarcane and citrus crops. Also having shown tolerance to tetflupyrolimet are the crops cotton, sunflower, soybean and maize.

Weeds affected

Tetflupyrolimet has shown effectiveness against mainly grass weeds, barnyardgrass, junglerice, early watergrass, late watergrass, Chinese strangletop, bearded strangletop, amazon stranglegrass, large crabgrass, saramollagrass, alexandergrass, giant foxtail, green foxtail, annual bluegrass, silky windgrass, Italian ryegrass and panicum, in addition to a couple of broadleaf weeds, monochoria and globe fringerush.
