= Napropamide =

- Skeletal formula of napropamide

Names
- Preferred IUPAC name N,N-Diethyl-2-naphthalen-1-yloxypropanamide

Identifiers
CAS Number	15299-99-7
3D model (JSmol)	Interactive image
Beilstein Reference	2217870
ChEBI	CHEBI:83771
ChEMBL	ChEMBL1877460
ChemSpider	25304
ECHA InfoCard	100.035.742
EC Number	239-333-3
KEGG	C18868
PubChem CID	27189
UNII	B56M9401K6
CompTox Dashboard (EPA)	DTXSID5024211
- InChI: InChI=1S/C17H21NO2/c1-4-18(5-2)17(19)13(3)20-16-12-8-10-14-9-6-7-11-15(14)16/h6-13H,4-5H2,1-3H3 Key: WXZVAROIGSFCFJ-UHFFFAOYSA-N
- SMILES: CCN(CC)C(=O)C(C)OC1=CC=CC2=CC=CC=C21

Properties
Chemical formula	C_{17}H_{21}NO_{2}
Molar mass	271.360 g·mol^{−1}
Density	1.18
Melting point	74.5 °C (166.1 °F; 347.6 K)
Solubility in water	63 mg/L
Vapor pressure	0.167 mPa
- Except where otherwise noted, data are given for materials in their standard state (at 25 °C [77 °F], 100 kPa). Infobox references

Napropamide is an acetamide herbicide. It was first sold under the trade name Devrinol, and was first manufactured in 1969. It is widely used in the European Union, and in Australia.

"Devrinol 50" is a wettable powder containing 50% napropamide.

Napropamide's mode of action is unknown, therefore the HRAC classification system calls it equivalently Group Z or Group 0, although it was formerly classified as Group K (Group K3 or 15).

== Chemistry ==
Napropamide inhibits root growth. It is used against annual grasses and broadleaf weeds. The d-isomer is noted as being significantly more effective than the racemic mixture against certain weeds. Its formula is C_{17}H_{21}NO_{2}.

== Tradenames ==
Napropamide has been sold as "Devrinol", "Jouster" and "Naprop".
