= Pyrasulfotole =

Weed control herbicide

Names
- IUPAC name (5-Hydroxy-1,3-dimethylpyrazol-4-yl)(α,α,α-trifluoro-2-mesyl-p-tolyl)methanone
- Other names: (5-Hydroxy-1,3-dimethyl-1H-pyrazol-4-yl)[2-(methanesulfonyl)-4-(trifluoromethyl)phenyl]methanone; (5-Hydroxy-1,3-dimethyl-1H-pyrazol-4-yl)[2-(methylsulfonyl)-4-(trifluoromethyl)phenyl]methanone

Identifiers
CAS Number	365400-11-9
3D model (JSmol)	Interactive image
ChEBI	CHEBI:141518
ChemSpider	9868437
ECHA InfoCard	100.123.578
PubChem CID	11693711
UNII	M31E7U368M
CompTox Dashboard (EPA)	DTXSID2044343
- InChI: InChI=1S/C14H13F3N2O4S/c1-7-11(13(21)19(2)18-7)12(20)9-5-4-8(14(15,16)17)6-10(9)24(3,22)23/h4-6,21H,1-3H3 Key: CZRVDACSCJKRFL-UHFFFAOYSA-N
- SMILES: CC1=C(C(=O)N(N1)C)C(=O)C2=C(C=C(C=C2)C(F)(F)F)S(=O)(=O)C

Properties
Chemical formula	C_{14}H_{13}F_{3}N_{2}O_{4}S
Molar mass	362.32 g·mol^{−1}
Appearance	Beige coloured powder
Density	1.53 kg/L, 15.3 lb/gal Imp
Melting point	201°C, 394°F
Solubility in water	69.1g/L
Solubility in ethanol	21.6 g/L
Solubility in toluene	6.9 g/L
Solubility in acetone	89.2 g/L
Solubility in ethyl acetate	37.2 g/L
Vapor pressure	270 nPa (3.9 x10^{-11} psi)

Hazards
- GHS labelling
Pictograms	(GHS08: Health hazard) (GHS09: Environmental hazard)
Signal word	Warning
Hazard statements	H373, H410
Precautionary statements	P260, P273, P319, P391, P501
Flash point	96°C, 205°F
- Except where otherwise noted, data are given for materials in their standard state (at 25 °C [77 °F], 100 kPa). Infobox references

Pyrasulfotole is a herbicide used to control broadleaf weeds in what and barley. It is a selective benzoylpyrazolone, pyrazole compound, registered in Canada and Australia in 2004, and the USA in 2007. Bayer patented it in Australia in 2006, and the patent expired in March 2026.

== Application ==
Pyrasulfotole is generally sold as an emulsifiable concentrate of 75-230 g/L, or 37.5 g/L in a mixture with bromoxynil.

Some pyrasulfotole formulations include mefenpyr-diethyl as a safener. Bayer's patent also covers other safeners: cloquintocet-mexyl and 4-cyclopropylaminocarbonyl-N-(2-methoxybenzoyl)benzenesulfonamide.

== Mechanism ==
It acts by one mechanism of action, inhibition of 4-hydroxyphenylpyruvate dioxygenase (HPPD), placing it in the Group H (Australia), Group F2 (global), Group 27 (numeric) HRAC class.

An APVMA report claims pyrasulfotole acts by two mechanisms of action: inhibiting "4-hydroxyphenylpyruvate deoxygenase" (sic) (HPPD) and disrupting plant cell growth, with a dual HRAC class of Groups F & I (Australia), though inhibiting HPPD is the MoA of Group H (Group 27), and as of 2026, pyrasulfotole is listed as only as Group H.

== Tradenames ==
Formulations of pyrasulfotole have been sold as Galaxy (Nufarm), Marathon (ADAMA), Precept (Bayer), and Pyrasulfotole 80 (4Farmers), and as an active ingredient in a mixture with bromoxynil as Pyra Brom (4Farmers), and Velocity (Bayer).
