= Naptalam =

Names
- Preferred IUPAC name N-1-naphthylphthalamic acid
- Other names: Naptalam; Naptalam sodium; NPA; 2-[(1-naphthalenylamino)carbonyl]benzoic acid

Identifiers
CAS Number	132-66-1
3D model (JSmol)	Interactive image
ChEBI	CHEBI:60833
ChEMBL	ChEMBL2447888
ChemSpider	8275
ECHA InfoCard	100.153.563
EC Number	625-029-1
KEGG	C18869
PubChem CID	8594
UNII	306R88V86P
CompTox Dashboard (EPA)	DTXSID6032437
- InChI: InChI=1S/C18H13NO3/c20-17(14-9-3-4-10-15(14)18(21)22)19-16-11-5-7-12-6-1-2-8-13(12)16/h1-11H,(H,19,20)(H,21,22) Key: JXTHEWSKYLZVJC-UHFFFAOYSA-N
- SMILES: C1=CC=C2C(=C1)C=CC=C2NC(=O)C3=CC=CC=C3C(=O)O

Properties
Chemical formula	C_{18}H_{12}NO_{3}
Molar mass	290.298 g·mol^{−1}
Appearance	Purple solid
Melting point	185 °C (acid), 234 °C (sodium salt)

Hazards
- Occupational safety and health (OHS/OSH)
Main hazards	Severe eye irritant
- Lethal dose or concentration (LD, LC)
LD_{50} (median dose)	8200 mg/kg (acid), 1700 mg/kg (salt) (rat, oral)
- Except where otherwise noted, data are given for materials in their standard state (at 25 °C [77 °F], 100 kPa). Infobox references

Naptalam is a selective preëmergent herbicide, first registered in the US in 1949, to control sundry annual broadleaf weeds and grasses. Naptalam is a phthalic acid, though it is commonly also in sodium salt form. It's also an aryl carboxylate, a phthalamate compound and an amide. It is also used in Australia and Canada. In 1974, the USA used 4.94 million pounds (2,240 t) in agriculture.

Naptalam is unstable at temperatures over 180 °C or pH over 9.5.

Naptalam's mode of action makes it a Group P or Group 19 herbicide under the HRAC classification. It is absorbed through the weed's primary roots and seeds.

== Application ==
Naptalam has been used on soybean, peanut, cucumber and melon crops, and ornamentals. Typical application rates are 2 to 6 lbs per acre (active ingredient), (2.25-6.75 kg/Ha). Formulations are usually water based liquids, or granular. While primarily preëmergent, naptalam may also be sprayed postemergently in some cases. Preëmergently, it should be applied within 48 hours of planting; weeds already emerged will usually not be controlled. Light incorporation (to 0.5-1 inch deep) may help if the soil is dry. Postemergently, it is done before plants start to vine. It may stunt the crop growth, but it should return to normal. Emerged weeds may be stunted too, but are not usually controlled.

It has been sold under the tradename "Alanap-L" and "Rescue" in the US, and has been manufactured by Uniroyal, Chemtura and Vertac. "Alanap-3" is a 240 g/L formulation sold in Canada.

== Environmental behaviour ==
In soil, naptalam is absorbed through the roots and translocated to the leaves. Soil mobility is high in fine sand, sandy loam, and silt loam; soil retention is increased with CEC and organic matter content.

Naptalam's toxicity is low for birds, fish, and aquatic invertebrates, presenting minimal hazard.

== Safety ==
Naptalam is not carcinogenic, even at 5000 mg/kg, the highest dose tested on mice. It has some teratogenicity, so the EPA recommends a NOEL of 15 mg/kg/day. However, it causes irreversible eye damage, and is corrosive.
