= Bixlozone =

Herbicide Active Ingredient

Names
- IUPAC name 2-(2,4-dichlorobenzyl)-4,4-dimethylisoxazolidin-3-one
- Preferred IUPAC name 2-[(2,4-dichlorophenyl)methyl]-4,4-dimethyl-1,2-oxazolidin-3-one
- Other names 2-[(2,4-dichlorophenyl)methyl]-4,4-dimethyl-3-isoxazolidinone

Identifiers
CAS Number	81777-95-9
3D model (JSmol)	Interactive image
ChEBI	CHEBI:149466
ChemSpider	15083828
ECHA InfoCard	100.283.288
EC Number	701-330-4
PubChem CID	15056663
UNII	K8T8B88NZ6
CompTox Dashboard (EPA)	DTXSID30567651
- InChI: InChI=1S/C12H13Cl2NO2/c1-12(2)7-17-15(11(12)16)6-8-3-4-9(13)5-10(8)14/h3-5H,6-7H2,1-2H3 Key: FHUKASKVKWSLCY-UHFFFAOYSA-N
- SMILES: CC1(CON(C1=O)CC2=C(C=C(C=C2)Cl)Cl)C

Properties
Chemical formula	C_{12}H_{13}Cl_{2}NO_{2}
Molar mass	274.14 g·mol^{−1}
Appearance	White crystalline solid
Density	1.37 g/mL
Melting point	81.5 °C (178.7 °F; 354.6 K)
Boiling point	Degrades at 188 °C (370 °F) before boiling
Solubility in water	42 mg/L
Solubility in acetone	>250 g/L
Solubility in methanol	120 g/L
Solubility in ethyl acetate	>250 g/L
Solubility in toluene	>250 g/L
Vapor pressure	2.3 mPa

Hazards
- GHS labelling
Pictograms	(GHS09: Environmental hazard)
Autoignition temperature	382 °C (720 °F; 655 K)
- Lethal dose or concentration (LD, LC)
LD_{50} (median dose)	>2000 mg/kg (rat, oral)
- Except where otherwise noted, data are given for materials in their standard state (at 25 °C [77 °F], 100 kPa). Infobox references

Bixlozone is a herbicidal active ingredient, announced by FMC in 2018, for commercial release in April 2021 in Australia. It is used to control broadleaf and grassy weeds

Bixlozone is a isoxazolidinone class herbicide, and is mildly lipophilic. It is the second herbicide with its mode of action, the other being clomazone (differing only by a single atom); they work by preventing carotenoid biosynthesis by inhibiting DXP synthase.

== Mechanism of action ==
Like clomazone, bixlozone blocks carotenoid synthesis in plants. The lack of protective carotenoid causes bleaching of leaves. Bixlozone is uptaken by the roots and shoots in germinating weed seedlings. It is mobile in xylem, but does not seem to move downward or between leaves.

Specifically, it blocks the terpenoid synthesis pathway, between isopentenyl pyrophosphate and geranylgeranyl pyrophosphate, which prevents the synthesis of plant pigments, chlorophyll, and carotenoids.

Bixlozone's HRAC Group is Group 13, Group F3 / F4, Group Q. (Numeric, Global, Australian)

=== Symptoms ===
Symptoms vary, but on grasses, typically bleaching in lines or streaks on the leaf, or whitening of the whole leaf. Chlorosis may occur at lower application rates between the veins and leaf margins. Some plants turn white. In particular, lolium (ryegrass) tends to turn pink.

Crop injury can happen under heavy rainfall after application, since bixlozone might wash into the seedbed.

== Safety ==
Bixlozone has low dermal, oral and inhalational actue toxicity, according to the APVMA. Nor is it an eye irritant or skin sensitiser, though it may be a mild skin irritant. If absorbed, it is excreted mainly in urine and the remainder in faeces. In the body, bixlozone and related metabolites have a half-life of 10-16 hours. Applied dermally, under 16% was absorbed from 0.25 g/L solution, and less at higher concentrations. It has a 21-day NOAEL of 1000 mg/kg/day, the highest dose tested on rats. On a chronic test, it has a NOAEL of 53 mg/kg/day, and showed no evidence of oncogenicity.

== Synthesis ==
3-Chloro-2,2-dimethylpropionyl chloride is transformed with hydroxylamine hydrochloride to a hydroxamic acid, which is then cyclised under strongly basic conditions to an isoxazolidinone. The isoxazolidinone can then be alkylated with 2,4-dichlorobenzyl chloride to produce bixlozone.

== Tradenames ==
Overwatch is a 400 g/L bixlozone suspension concentrate. Its viscosity is 103 mPa.s at 20°C, comparable to olive oil. Isoflex Active is technical grade bixlozone.

== Weeds controlled ==
Bixlozone can control annual grasses including ryegrass, barnyardgrass, crabgrass, foxtail, canarygrass, goosegrass, bluegrass, and (suppression only) blackgrass. It controls the broadleaf weeds common chickweed, speedwells, shepherd's purse and wild chamomile.

Herbicide resistance to this mode of action is rare, with only three global populations so reported by 2022.
