= Benzoylprop =

- Benzoylprop-ethyl

Names
- Preferred IUPAC name Ethyl N-benzoyl-N-(3,4-dichlorophenyl)-DL-alaninate
- Other names: SD 30053; WL17731; N-Benzoyl-N-(3,4-dichlorophenyl)-DL-alanine (benzoylprop)

Identifiers
CAS Number	Benzoylprop-ethyl: 22212-55-1
3D model (JSmol)	Benzoylprop-ethyl: Interactive image
ChEBI	Benzoylprop-ethyl: CHEBI:82171
ChemSpider	Benzoylprop-ethyl: 28825
ECHA InfoCard	100.040.753
EC Number	Benzoylprop-ethyl: 244-845-5
KEGG	Benzoylprop-ethyl: C19043
PubChem CID	Benzoylprop-ethyl: 31068
UNII	Benzoylprop-ethyl: 95764D9P7D
CompTox Dashboard (EPA)	Benzoylprop-ethyl: DTXSID7040281
- InChI: Benzoylprop-ethyl: InChI=1S/C18H17Cl2NO3/c1-3-24-18(23)12(2)21(14-9-10-15(19)16(20)11-14)17(22)13-7-5-4-6-8-13/h4-12H,3H2,1-2H3 Key: SLCGUGMPSUYJAY-UHFFFAOYSA-N
- SMILES: Benzoylprop-ethyl: CCOC(=O)C(C)N(C1=CC(=C(C=C1)Cl)Cl)C(=O)C2=CC=CC=C2

Properties
Chemical formula	C_{18}H_{17}Cl_{2}NO_{3}
Molar mass	366.24 g·mol^{−1}
Appearance	Colourless crystalline solid
Solubility in water	20 mg/L

Hazards
- Lethal dose or concentration (LD, LC)
LD_{50} (median dose)	>1200 mg/kg (rat, oral, benzoylprop); 712 mg/kg (mice, oral, benzoylprop-ethyl); 1000 mg/kg (rat, dermal, ethyl)
- Except where otherwise noted, data are given for materials in their standard state (at 25 °C [77 °F], 100 kPa). Infobox references

Benzoylprop (or benzoylprop-ethyl) is a herbicide introduced in 1969 to control wild oats. It was considered obsolete, but was reintroduced in Iran in 2017 to combat herbicide resistance. It is a selective, postemergent, amide, arylalanine, arylaminopropionic acid herbicide, of the dichloroaniline propionate family.

Benzoylprop-ethyl is the common chemical version, though its herbicidal activity comes after it degrades post application to benzoylprop, the acid.

Data in the information box is given for benzoylprop-ethyl.

== History ==
Benzoylprop-ethyl was introduced in 1969, and to Iran in 1975. In 1986, 64,000 hectares (158,000 acres) were treated with benzoylprop in the United Kingdom.

The high application rate, about 1000 g/Ha active ingredient, and narrow target spectrum, of winter wild oats and wild barley made it uncompetitive against other herbicides, and in the 1990s its use ended in Iran, replaced with broad-spectrum ACCase- and ALS-inhibitor herbicides. As of 2025 the Pesticide Properties Database still reports benzoylprop to be obsolete.

With herbicide-resistant wild oats reported in Australia, France and Iran by 2019, and with resistant wild barley becoming common in Iran, it was re-introduced in 2017 as "Piraffix".

== Mechanism ==
Benzoylprop is a Group K, Group K3, Group 15 herbicide (Australian, Global, numeric) under the HRAC classification system of herbicide mode of action. It inhibits lipid biosynthesis. Other sources claim the mode of action is unknown.

Benzylprop is mobile in the phloem and moves from the foliage to the stem, where it inhibits stem elongation by cellular effect. Benzylprop-ethyl is biologically inactive until degraded to benzylprop. The effect, and therefore selectivity, on plants is dependent on the rate of de-esterification (of benzoylprop-ethyl to benzoylprop) and subsequent detoxification of benzoylprop to inactive compounds. For example, the de-esterification is slow in wheat, where benzoylprop cannot build up to phytotoxic levels, and so has minimal effect, and faster in barley, and faster again in oats, where the greater amounts of benzoylprop formed stunt the crop's growth.

Drought conditions reduce benzoylprop's efficacy significantly, with roughly 50% higher application rates being required. This is possibly due to reduced rate of photosynthesis, or reduced stomatal conductance, limiting herbicidal uptake.

Symptoms

Affected plants have reduced elongation in leaves and stem, with the leaves a darker green and areas of chlorosis and necrosis appearing from the leaf tips, and the affected plants tended to tiller much more.

== Environmental behaviour ==
It has a moderate toxicity to fish, with an LC_{50} of 0.494 mg/L for freshwater fish.

== Formulations ==
It was sold as Suffix, a Shell trademarked 20% emulsifiable concentrate, later 250 g/L, and as Endaven. The 2017 reintroduction was called Piraffix.
