= EPTC =

EPTC may refer to:

- Eswatini Posts and Telecommunications Corporation
- S-Ethyl dipropylcarbamothioate, an herbicide
