= Pyroxasulfone =

Names
- Preferred IUPAC name 3-{[5-(Difluoromethoxy)-1-methyl-3-(trifluoromethyl)-1H-pyrazol-4-yl]methanesulfonyl}-5,5-dimethyl-4,5-dihydro-1,2-oxazole

Identifiers
| CAS Number | 447399-55-5 |
| 3D model (JSmol) | Interactive image |
| Beilstein Reference | 11328918 |
| ChEBI | CHEBI:234004 |
| ChEMBL | ChEMBL2251728 |
| ChemSpider | 9731687 |
| ECHA InfoCard | 100.226.874 |
| EC Number | 800-417-5 |
| PubChem CID | 11556910 |
| UNII | 04XP114422 |
| CompTox Dashboard (EPA) | DTXSID4058104 |
- InChI: InChI=1S/C12H14F5N3O4S/c1-11(2)4-7(19-24-11)25(21,22)5-6-8(12(15,16)17)18-20(3)9(6)23-10(13)14/h10H,4-5H2,1-3H3 Key: CASLETQIYIQFTQ-UHFFFAOYSA-N
- SMILES: CC1(CC(=NO1)S(=O)(=O)CC2=C(N(N=C2C(F)(F)F)C)OC(F)F)C

Properties
| Chemical formula | C_{12}H_{14}F_{5}N_{3}O_{4}S |
| Molar mass | 391.31 g·mol^{−1} |

Hazards
- GHS labelling
| Pictograms | (GHS08: Health hazard) (GHS09: Environmental hazard) |
| Signal word | Danger |
| Hazard statements | H372, H410 |
| Precautionary statements | P260, P264, P270, P273, P314, P391, P501 |
- Except where otherwise noted, data are given for materials in their standard state (at 25 °C [77 °F], 100 kPa). Infobox references

Pyroxasulfone is a pre-emergence herbicide that inhibits the production of very long chain fatty acids in plants. The structure of the existing herbicide thiobencarb served as the basis for development but pyroxasulfone requires a lower dose (100–25 g/ha) and is more stable resulting in longer efficacy. As of 2016 it had been registered for use in Japan, Australia, USA, Canada, Saudi Arabia and South Africa and was used on crops including maize, soybean, wheat and cotton. In 2015 it was applied to over 6 million hectares of land. Pyroxasulfone is from a novel chemical class but has a similar mode of action to acetamide herbicides such as metolachlor, acetochlor and dimethenamid. It is mainly used to control annual grasses but is also effective against broadleaf weeds including lambsquarters (Chenopodium berlandieri), pigweed and waterhemp (both Amaranthus species) and black nightshade (Solanum nigrum)

Pyroxasulfone is classified by the Herbicide Resistance Action Committee as Group K (Aus), Group 15 (numeric).

Pyroxasulfone was discovered by Keiai Research Institute in Japan.

== Application ==
Stubble-cover reduces effectiveness, but a greater water rate offsets the effect. A test saw increased control of ryegrass with more water sprayed. Droplet size did not affect the results, and a similar effect was seen with trifluralin, despite large differences in adsorption and solubility.

Sakura in Australia is applied at 100 g/Ha (0.09 lbs/ac) active ingredient. It requires rainfall within 7-10 days of application, and is most effective when applied right before sowing. If weed seeds are buried deeply, pyroxasulfone may struggle to control them.

Sakura may be used on wheat (not durum wheat), triticale, chickpeas, field peas, lentils, and lupins, to control annual ryegrass, paradoxa grass (Phalaris paradoxa), barley grass, silver grass (Vulpia myuros) and toad rush, or to suppress great brome and wild oat.
