= Tebuthiuron =

Nonselective broad spectrum herbicide

Names
- Preferred IUPAC name N-(5-tert-Butyl-1,3,4-thiadiazol-2-yl)-N,N′-dimethylurea
- Other names Spike; Brulan; Brush Bullet; EL-103; Graslan; Perflan; Herbec; Herbic; Reclaim

Identifiers
CAS Number	34014-18-1
3D model (JSmol)	Interactive image
ChEBI	CHEBI:81745
ChEMBL	ChEMBL1557493
ChemSpider	5190
ECHA InfoCard	100.047.070
EC Number	251-793-7
KEGG	C18436
PubChem CID	5383
UNII	E5OX6GM11E
UN number	3077
CompTox Dashboard (EPA)	DTXSID3024316
- InChI: InChI=1S/C9H16N4OS/c1-9(2,3)6-11-12-8(15-6)13(5)7(14)10-4/h1-5H3,(H,10,14) Key: HBPDKDSFLXWOAE-UHFFFAOYSA-N; InChI=1/C9H16N4OS/c1-9(2,3)6-11-12-8(15-6)13(5)7(14)10-4/h1-5H3,(H,10,14) Key: HBPDKDSFLXWOAE-UHFFFAOYAB
- SMILES: O=C(N(c1nnc(s1)C(C)(C)C)C)NC

Properties
Chemical formula	C_{9}H_{16}N_{4}OS
Molar mass	228.31 g·mol^{−1}
Appearance	Off-white to buff-colored crystalline solid
Density	1.186 g/cm^{3}
Melting point	163.19 °C (325.74 °F; 436.34 K) (mean or weighted MP)
Boiling point	394.23 °C (741.61 °F; 667.38 K) (Adapted Stein & Brown method)
Solubility in water	2500 mg/L
Vapor pressure	0.27 mPa

Hazards
- Occupational safety and health (OHS/OSH)
Main hazards	dangerous for the environment
- GHS labelling
Pictograms	(GHS07: Exclamation mark) (GHS09: Environmental hazard)
Signal word	Warning
Hazard statements	H302, H410
Precautionary statements	P264, P270, P273, P301+P312, P330, P391, P501
- Lethal dose or concentration (LD, LC)
LD_{50} (median dose)	644mg/kg (rat, oral); 286mg/kg (rabbit, oral); >500mg/kg (dogs, oral)
Safety data sheet (SDS)	ChemAdvisor MSDS
- Except where otherwise noted, data are given for materials in their standard state (at 25 °C [77 °F], 100 kPa). Infobox references

Tebuthiuron is a nonselective broad spectrum herbicide of the urea class. It is used to control weeds, woody and herbaceous plants, and sugar cane. It is absorbed by the roots and transported to the leaves, where it inhibits photosynthesis. The ingredient was discovered by Air Products and Chemicals, but was registered by Elanco in the United States in 1974, and later sold to Dow AgroSciences.

== Environmental impacts ==
The Environmental Protection Agency considers tebuthiuron to have a great potential for groundwater contamination, due to its high water solubility, low adsorption to soil particles, and high persistence in soil (soil half-life can exceed 360 days).

In Europe, tebuthiuron has been banned since November 2002.

== Application ==
Tebuthiuron is used agriculturally in Australia and the United States, usually formulated as granules, pellets or a wettable powder. Pellets can be applied by hand (e.g. onto a clump of regrowth or along a fenceline), and by aircraft or ground equipment. It can be applied any time of year, and once applied remains effective for several years. Tebuthiuron (as a 20% pellet) is applied at 0.5-2 g/m^{2}, equating to 0.1-0.4 g/m^{2} of active ingredient.

Tebuthiuron's herbicide resistance class is Group C, (Australia), C2 (global), Group 7, (numeric, i.e. Group 5, due to a merger).

== Vandalism ==
In 2010, tebuthiuron in the form of Dow AgroSciences Spike 80DF was deliberately used in an act of vandalism to poison the live oak trees at Toomer's Corner on the Auburn University campus following the 2010 Iron Bowl. The lone perpetrator, a University of Alabama fan, was charged with first-degree criminal mischief and jailed on a $50,000 bond. Remediation involved removing about 1,780 tons of contaminated material.

In 2021, Arthur and Amelia Bond, wealthy summer residents of Camden, Maine poisoned their neighbor's oak trees with tebuthiuron to obtain a better view of Camden Harbor. They paid over $200,000 in fines to address illegal pesticide use and environmental contamination, and $1.5 million to settle with their neighbor.

== Tradenames ==
Tebuthiuron has been sold as "Tebuthiuron", "Brush", "Bullet", "Graslan", "Herbic", "Outlaw", "Perflan", "Reclaim", "Spike" and "Tebulex".
