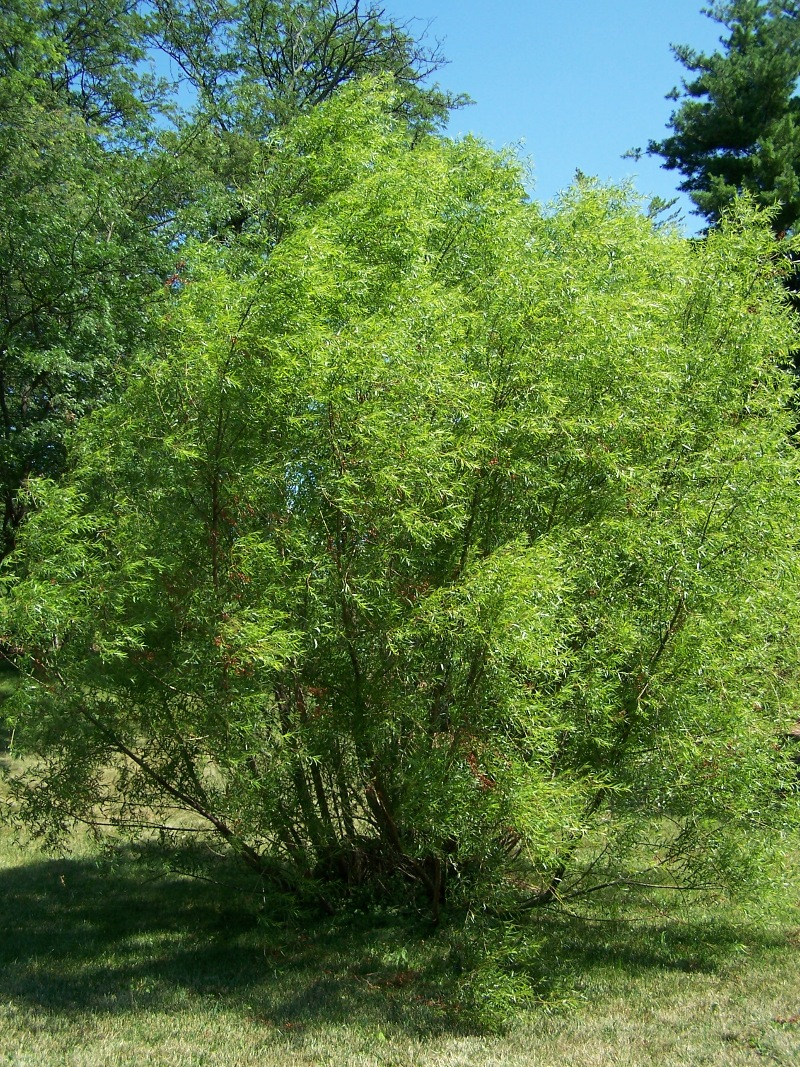
- In the Morton Arboretum

Conservation status
- Least Concern (IUCN 3.1)

Scientific classification
- Kingdom: Plantae
- Clade: Tracheophytes
- Clade: Angiosperms
- Clade: Eudicots
- Clade: Rosids
- Order: Malpighiales
- Family: Salicaceae
- Genus: Salix
- Species: S. nigra

Binomial name
- Salix nigra Marshall
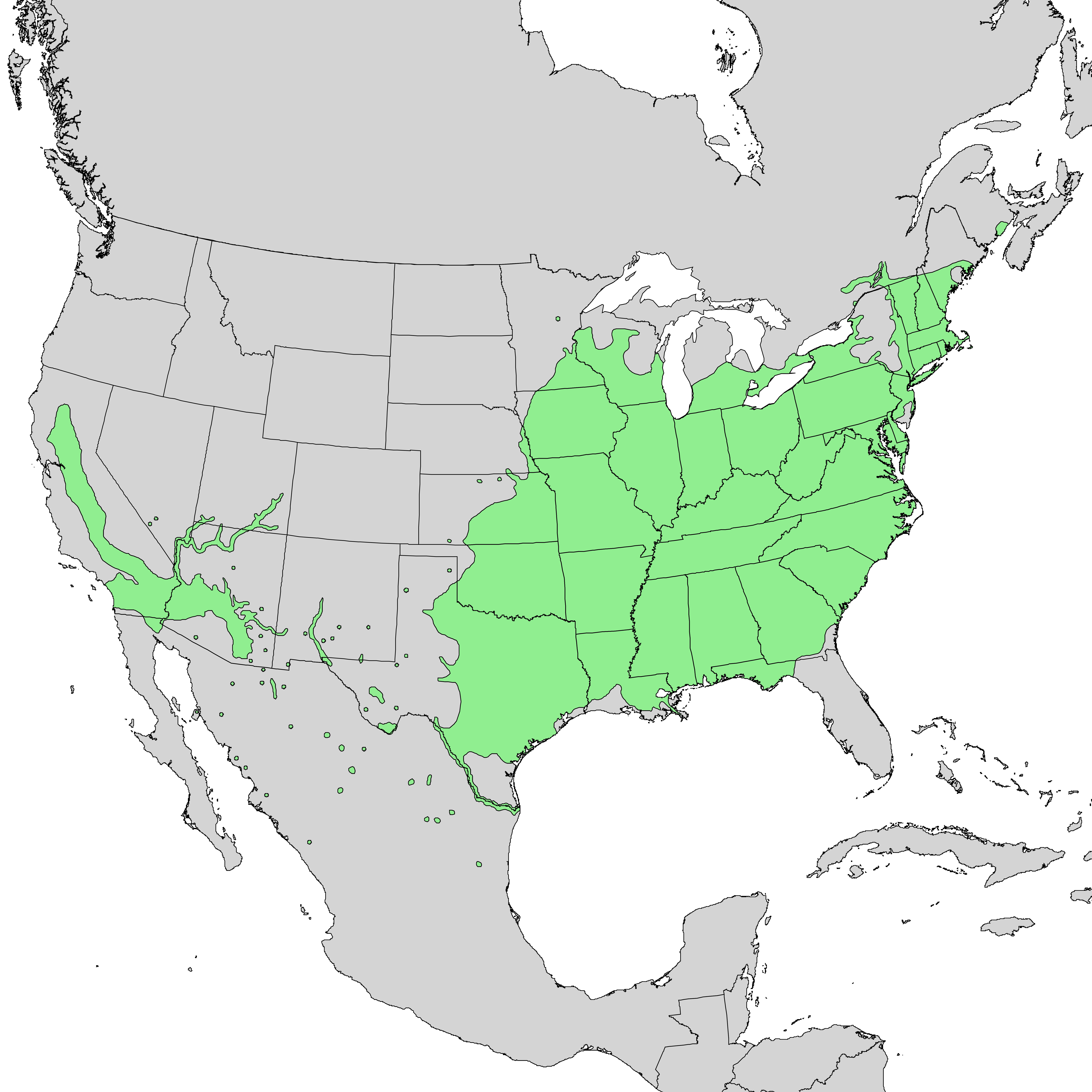
- Natural range

= Salix nigra =

Species of tree

Salix nigra, or the black willow, is a species of willow native to a large portion of North America, from New Brunswick and southern Ontario west to Arizona and California, and south to northern Florida and Texas.

== Description ==
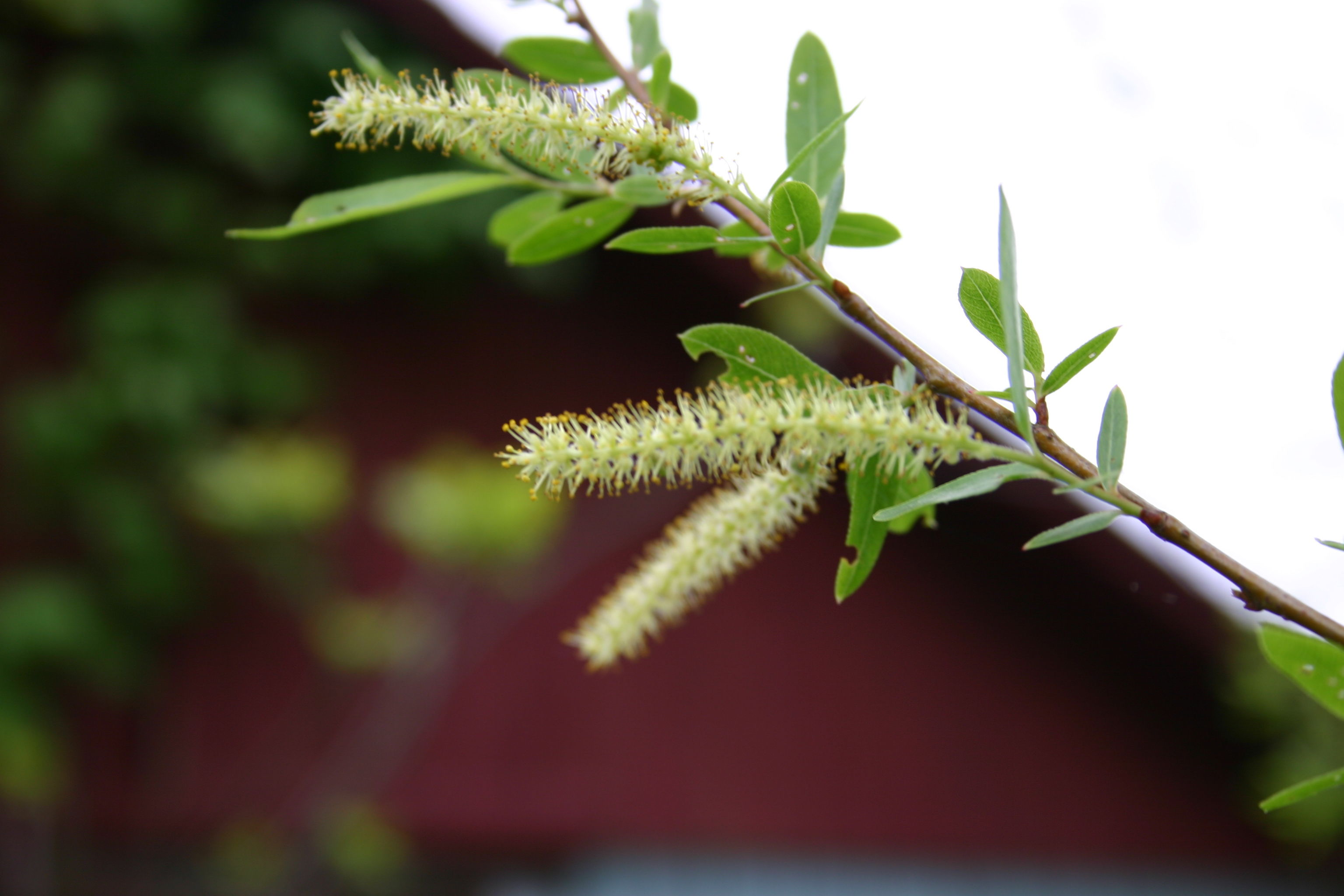
Flowers

Salix nigra is a medium-sized deciduous tree, the largest North American species of willow, growing to 10–30 m (35–100 ft) tall, exceptionally up to 45 m (148 ft), with a trunk 50–80 centimeters (20–30 in) diameter. The bark is dark brown to blackish, becoming fissured in older trees, and frequently forking near the base. The shoots are slender and variable in color from green to brown, yellow or purplish; they are (like the related European Salix fragilis) brittle at the base, snapping evenly at the branch junction if bent sharply. The foliage buds are 2–4 millimetres (1/16–3/16 in) long, with a single, pointed reddish-brown bud scale. The leaves are alternate, long, thin, 5–15 centimeters (2–6 in) long and 0.5–2 centimeters (1/4–3/4 in) broad, usually somewhat falcate, dark, shiny green on both sides or with a lighter green underside, with a finely serrated margin, a short petiole and a pair of small stipules. It is dioecious, with small, greenish yellow to yellow flowers borne on catkins 2.5–7.5 centimeters (1–3 in) long in early spring at the same time as the new leaves appear. The fruit is a 5 millimeters (3/16 in) capsule which splits open when mature to release the numerous minute, down-covered seeds. The leaves turn a lemon yellow in the fall.

== Distribution and habitat ==
Salix nigra is native to a large portion of North America, from New Brunswick and southern Ontario west to California and Arizona, and south to northern Florida and Texas. It is also found in parts of Mexico, both south and west of the Rio Grande. It has also been introduced along streams in the state of Utah. Salix nigra grows best in areas of full sun and wet or moist soils. Thus, it is typically found along streams and in swamps.

== Taxonomy ==
Black willow is part of the Salicaceae, the willow family. The accepted name for black willow is: Salix nigra Marshall. Marshall, the "Father of American Dendrology", first described this taxon in 1785.

Salix gooddingii (Goodding's willow) is sometimes considered a variety of S. nigra as S. nigra var. vallicola Dudley; when recognized, this extends the range of S. nigra to western North America. However, the two are usually treated as distinct species. Some other related taxa and synonyms are S. nigra var. altissima, S. nigra var. brevijulis, S. nigra var. longifolia, S. nigra var. marginata, and S. nigra var. wardii.

Another name occasionally used for black willow is "swamp willow", not to be confused with Salix myrtilloides (swamp willow). Other common names include "Goodding willow", "southwestern black willow", "Dudley willow", and "sauz" (a Spanish word).

== Reproduction and growth ==
Salix nigra is dioecious, which means it has separate male and female trees. Flowering may be climate dependent. It flowers during February in the southern part of its range, and flowers until June in the northern parts. These trees are capable of producing seeds when they are around the age of 10 years. The black willow continuously has good seed crops year after year, with only a few failures. The seeds require very specific conditions to germinate. They prefer soil that is very wet or flooded. After they germinate, they can experience excellent growth if they are exposed to high sunlight and copious moisture during the growing season.

Black willow are capable of developing special features related to flood tolerance to help them survive in flooded habitats. Under flooded conditions, black willow develop hypertrophied lenticels and water roots. Black willows are also sensitive to drought conditions. Black willows living in drought conditions experience inhibition of their branch and root growth.

Early season leaves of some species in the Salix genus generally contain denser indumentum than leaves that are produced later in the season. Indumentum refers to hairs that are red or brown in color. Salix have first leaves, which are leaves that grow from the bud, and can also be called leaves that are "preformed". The leaves that form as the branch continues to grow out are called new leaves, or "neoformed".

== Largest example ==
According to the National Register of Champion Trees, the largest black willow tree in the US is in Washington County, Minnesota. As of its last measurement in 2017, its height is 91 feet (28 m), circumference is 315 inches (8,000 mm) and crown spread is 75 feet (23 m).

The Marlboro Tree, located in Marlboro Township, New Jersey is certified by the State of New Jersey as the largest known example of this tree in the state. It is about 152 years old and measures 76 feet (23 m) in height and 19.7 feet (6.0 m) in circumference. Five grown people must hold hands to fully encircle the tree.

== Uses ==
Black willow roots are very bitter and have been used as a substitute for quinine in the past. Ethnobotanical uses of black willow by various Native American tribes include basketry, and treatment of fever, headache, and coughs.

The black willow is the only willow native to the United States to be used as timber for a variety of different items. Black willow lumber is used in furniture and shipping containers. The largest production site for black willow timber was in Louisiana at its peak during the 1970s.

The wood of Salix nigra is very lightweight. The wood was once used for artificial limbs, such as wooden hands. It is also capable of maintaining its shape, does not splinter very easily, and has a moderately high shock resistance, allowing it to sustain continuous moderate impacts.

It is also used in environmental restoration, especially as an erosion control tool. Black willow is very resistant to herbivory and flooding. Salix nigra is used for marshland stabilization or restoration projects as long as the roots don't penetrate any clay liner that may be in place. Salix nigra demonstrated some success as a photodegradation tool. Photodegradation is theorized to work by drawing the target chemical, such as bentazon, up the roots and stem into the leaves where it is degraded by high-energy radiation provided by the sun.

== Disease ==
Black willows are susceptible to diseases such as crown gall and cankers. Crown gall is caused by bacteria living in the soil where the black willow is present. When black willow are infected, the bacteria stimulate a quick burst in growth of plant cells. They cause the tree to form tumor-like growths, or "galls" on different parts of the tree such as their roots or on the lower branches. As these galls get bigger, they become hard, woody, brown in color, and corky. Black willows do not normally die from crown galls. However, these galls can cause a disruption in the flow of nutrients throughout the tree and can have its normal growth stunted or slowed down due to this disease. Crown galls are less problematic in soils that are more acidic; thus, soil pH can be an important factor in helping to limit this disease.

Black canker disease is caused by the fungus Glomerella miyabeana. This disease starts as spotting on the leaves of the black willow, where it then spreads to the petiole and eventually the twig or branch holding the leaf. It then forms black patches on the stem of the tree that are capable of expanding. Black willows that are in nutrient-poor locations or that are experiencing poor temporary climate conditions (such as a temporary lack of rainfall or short, drought-like conditions) are considered stressed and very susceptible to the spread of these cankers. Tissue on the black willow that is affected by these cankers will not grow with the rest of the tree, and cracks will begin to form.
