= Ethofumesate =

Weed control herbicide

Names
- IUPAC name (2-ethoxy-3,3-dimethyl-2H-1-benzofuran-5-yl) methanesulfonate

Identifiers
CAS Number	26225-79-6
3D model (JSmol)	Interactive image
ChEBI	CHEBI:83768
ChEMBL	ChEMBL2133153
ChemSpider	30816
ECHA InfoCard	100.043.190
EC Number	247-525-3
KEGG	C18829
PubChem CID	33360
UNII	3051U1Z8KV
CompTox Dashboard (EPA)	DTXSID8034580
- InChI: InChI=1S/C13H18O5S/c1-5-16-12-13(2,3)10-8-9(18-19(4,14)15)6-7-11(10)17-12/h6-8,12H,5H2,1-4H3 Key: IRCMYGHHKLLGHV-UHFFFAOYSA-N
- SMILES: CCOC1C(C2=C(O1)C=CC(=C2)OS(=O)(=O)C)(C)C

Properties
Chemical formula	C_{13}H_{18}O_{5}S
Molar mass	286.34 g·mol^{−1}
- Except where otherwise noted, data are given for materials in their standard state (at 25 °C [77 °F], 100 kPa). Infobox references

Ethofumesate is a pre- and post-emergent benzofuran herbicide used on sugar beets to control weeds, notably blackgrasses. UK registration in 2016 is planned for preëmergent use on wheat as an auxiliary component of tank mix. Ethofumesate is used in Australia, to control wintergrasses in turfgrasses, along fencelines and tree plantations. Young weeds absorb ethofumesate through roots and shoots, and the ethofumesate inhibits respiration and photosynthesis. Ethofumesate is a Group J (Australia), K3 (Global), Group 15 (numeric), resistance class herbicide.

In soil is ethofumesate biodegraded by soil's microörganisms. In soils with over 1% organic matter content, ethofumesate doesn't leach. The halflife in soil is 5-14 weeks, and residual herbicide activity can last four to eight months.

Nortron is an ethofumesate emulsifiable concentrate from Nor-Am.

== Links ==
- Ethofumesate in the Pesticide Properties DataBase (PPDB)
