= Cynmethylin =

Names
- Preferred IUPAC name rac-(1R,2S,4S)-1-methyl-2-[(2-methylphenyl)methoxy]-4-(propan-2-yl)-7-oxabicyclo[2.2.1]heptane
- Other names: WL 95481; SD 95481; rac-(1R,2S,4S)-1-methyl-4-(1-methylethyl)-2-((2-methylphenyl)methoxy)-7-oxabicyclo[2.2.1]heptane; rel-(1R,2S,4S)-1-methyl-4-(1-methylethyl)-2-((2-methylphenyl)methoxy)-7-oxabicyclo[2.2.1]heptan

Identifiers
CAS Number	87818-31-3
3D model (JSmol)	Interactive image
ChEBI	CHEBI:145563
ChEMBL	ChEMBL1903971
ChemSpider	163945
ECHA InfoCard	100.100.423
EC Number	402-410-9
KEGG	C10903
PubChem CID	91745
UNII	ZV3871E43Y
CompTox Dashboard (EPA)	DTXSID3034456
- InChI: InChI=1S/C18H26O2/c1-13(2)18-10-9-17(4,20-18)16(11-18)19-12-15-8-6-5-7-14(15)3/h5-8,13,16H,9-12H2,1-4H3/t16-,17+,18-/m1/s1 Key: QMTNOLKHSWIQBE-UHFFFAOYSA-N
- SMILES: CC1=CC=CC=C1COC2CC3(CCC2(O3)C)C(C)C

Properties
Chemical formula	C_{18}H_{26}O_{2}
Molar mass	274.404 g·mol^{−1}
Appearance	Colourless
Melting point	−56 °C (−69 °F; 217 K)
Boiling point	330 °C (626 °F; 603 K)

Hazards
- Lethal dose or concentration (LD, LC)
LD_{50} (median dose)	>2000 mg/kg (rat, oral)
- Except where otherwise noted, data are given for materials in their standard state (at 25 °C [77 °F], 100 kPa). Infobox references

Cynmethylin (or cinmethylin) is a preëmergent cineole herbicide used in Australia on wheat, and commonly for rice and cereal crops. It is the only Group T (Aus) (Group Q, global, Group 30, numeric) herbicide. It controls annual ryegrass and the unusual mode of action avoids resistance. It works by inhibiting fatty acid thioesterase, disrupting cell membranes. It was introduced in 1989. As of 2025, approval is pending in Europe.

Cynmethylin was first registered in Australia in 2003 (as an active product), but as a product only in 2019, by BASF, as a 750 g/l emulsifiable concentrate.

Cynmethylin can provide 12 weeks' residual control.

It is sold under the tradenames "Luximax", "Cinch" and "Argold".
