= Cyclopyrimorate =

Names
- Preferred IUPAC name 6-chloro-3-(2-cyclopropyl-6-methylphenoxy)pyridazin-4-yl morpholine-4-carboxylate
- Other names: H-965; 6-chloro-3-(2-cyclopropyl-6-methylphenoxy)-4-pyridazinyl 4-morpholinecarboxylate

Identifiers
CAS Number	499231-24-2
3D model (JSmol)	Interactive image
ChEBI	CHEBI:142780
ChemSpider	16050194
EC Number	952-668-6
PubChem CID	23013854
UNII	0SVL4HSS2F
CompTox Dashboard (EPA)	DTXSID40198157
- InChI: InChI=1S/C19H20ClN3O4/c1-12-3-2-4-14(13-5-6-13)17(12)27-18-15(11-16(20)21-22-18)26-19(24)23-7-9-25-10-8-23/h2-4,11,13H,5-10H2,1H3 Key: BXIGJZDQFDFASM-UHFFFAOYSA-N
- SMILES: CC1=C(C(=CC=C1)C2CC2)OC3=NN=C(C=C3OC(=O)N4CCOCC4)Cl

Properties
Chemical formula	C_{19}H_{20}ClN_{3}O_{4}
Molar mass	389.84 g·mol^{−1}

Hazards
- Lethal dose or concentration (LD, LC)
LD_{50} (median dose)	>5000 mg/kg (rat, oral)
- Except where otherwise noted, data are given for materials in their standard state (at 25 °C [77 °F], 100 kPa). Infobox references

Cyclopyrimorate is a selective pyridazine herbicide, used to control broadleaf weeds and grassy weeds, on cereals and rice. It was launched in 2019 in Japan, and is also used in China. Its mode of action is new, and cyclopyrimorate is the first member of the HRAC Group 33, (Group T, global), coming after decades of no new mode-of-action discoveries.

It was invented by Mitsui Chemicals Agro, who sell it tradenamed "Cyra". They discovered it by modifying the structures of other pyridazine herbicides, such as pyridafol and credazine.

Cyclopyrimorate works by a novel target site, of homogentisate solanesyltransferase (HST). The new mechanism avoids resistance to acetolactate synthase inhibitor herbicides. It symptomatically causes bleaching, similar to other cartenoid biosynthesis inhibitors like mesotrione and norflurazon, however cyclopyrimorate is the only one to inhibit HST.

== Links ==
- Cyclopyrimorate in the Pesticide Properties DataBase (PPDB)
