= Riemschneider thiocarbamate synthesis =

The Riemschneider thiocarbamate synthesis converts alkyl or aryl thiocyanates to thiocarbamates under acidic conditions, followed by hydrolysis with ice water. The reaction was discovered by the German chemist Randolph Riemschneider in 1951 as a more efficient method to produce thiocarbamates. Some references spell the name Riemenschneider.

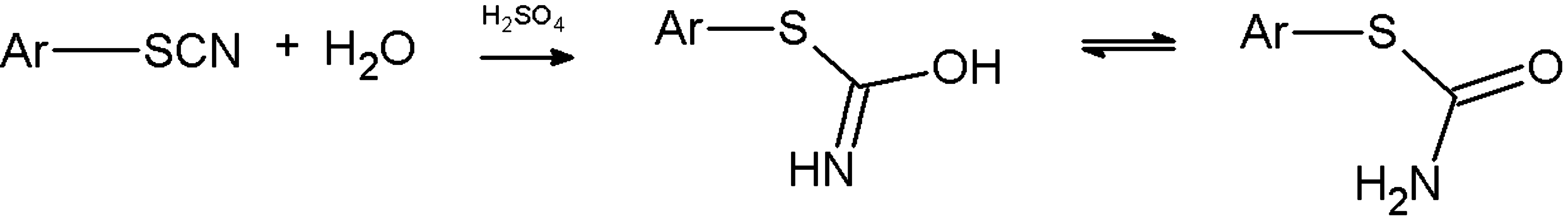

The Riemschneider reaction can also be used to create the corresponding N-substituted thiocarbamate from an alcohol or alkene.

== Mechanism ==
The mechanism for the conversion of an alcohol to the N-substituted thiocarbamate is shown below. The reaction proceeds under acidic conditions. The alcohol accepts a hydrogen ion from sulfuric acid to form a water, which then leaves, creating a carbocation. The mesomeric form of the cyanogroup reacts with the carbocation. The carbocation is attacked by a water, which then loses a hydrogen to form the product. The product then undergoes hydrolysis to form the N-substituted thiocarbamate.

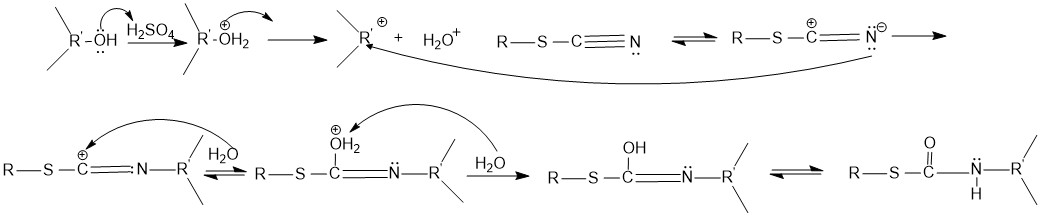

The reaction requires the formation of a carbocation and does not work for primary alcohols. Only secondary and tertiary alcohols undergo the Riemschneider reaction.

== Uses and Limitations ==
The Riemschneider thiocarbamate synthesis for aromatic compounds does not work efficiently for ortho-substituted compounds such as ortho-carboxy, ortho-methoxy or ortho-nitro derivative compounds. The reaction is also not as efficient for compounds that are sensitive to concentrated acid, such as thiocyanophenols. The reaction works well for other compounds. Various thiocyanate compounds underwent the Riemschneider synthesis to form thiocarbamates, and all had melting points similar to the predicted value.
