= Pinoxaden =

Names
- IUPAC name 8-(2,6-diethyl-p-tolyl)-1,2,4,5-tetrahydro-7-oxo-7H-pyrazolo[1,2-d][1,4,5]oxadiazepin-9-yl 2,2- dimethylpropionate

Identifiers
CAS Number	243973-20-8
3D model (JSmol)	Interactive image
ChEBI	CHEBI:83524
ChEMBL	ChEMBL1866631
ChemSpider	182281
ECHA InfoCard	100.163.258
EC Number	635-361-9
PubChem CID	210326
UNII	U55GLF9LV9
CompTox Dashboard (EPA)	DTXSID8034823
- InChI: InChI=1S/C23H32N2O4/c1-7-16-13-15(3)14-17(8-2)18(16)19-20(26)24-9-11-28-12-10-25(24)21(19)29-22(27)23(4,5)6/h13-14H,7-12H2,1-6H3 Key: MGOHCFMYLBAPRN-UHFFFAOYSA-N
- SMILES: CCC1=CC(=CC(=C1C2=C(N3CCOCCN3C2=O)OC(=O)C(C)(C)C)CC)C

Properties
Chemical formula	C_{23}H_{32}N_{2}O_{4}
Molar mass	400.519 g·mol^{−1}
Solubility in water	Moderate

Hazards
- GHS labelling
Pictograms	(GHS07: Exclamation mark) (GHS08: Health hazard) (GHS09: Environmental hazard)
Signal word	Warning
Hazard statements	H302, H317, H319, H332, H335, H361, H400, H412
Precautionary statements	P203, P261, P264, P264+P265, P270, P271, P272, P273, P280, P301+P317, P302+P352, P304+P340, P305+P351+P338, P317, P318, P319, P321, P330, P333+P317, P337+P317, P362+P364, P391, P403+P233, P405, P501
- Lethal dose or concentration (LD, LC)
LD_{50} (median dose)	>5000 mg/kg (rat, oral); >2000 mg/kg (rat, dermal)
LC_{50} (median concentration)	>5220 mg/m^{3}
- Except where otherwise noted, data are given for materials in their standard state (at 25 °C [77 °F], 100 kPa). Infobox references

Pinoxaden is a post-emergent phenylpyrazoline herbicide used to control grass weeds in wheat and barley. It is used in the UK and Europe. Japan has a high MRL (maximum residue level) and may use pinoxaden too. It is also registered in India.

Pinoxaden's HRAC classification is Group A (Australia and global), or Group 1 (numeric). Group A herbicides inhibit acetyl CoA carboxylase, (ACCase).

== Application ==
Pinoxaden may be applied by air or ground equipment at a rate of 15-30 g/Ha (active ingredient), with a spray volume of 50 to 110 L/Ha, or 20-30 L/Ha if applied aerially.

Pinoxaden can control wild oats, paradoxa grass and canary grass.

Cloquintocet-mexyl is similar to pinoxaden and included in many pinoxaden formulations.

== Safety ==
Pinoxden is practically non-toxic, with acute LD_{50}s of over 5000 mg/kg (oral) and over 2000 mg/kg (skin contact). It is a severe eye irritant, but not a skin irritant.

Dogs have been tested with doses of 250 to 1000 mg/kg/day of pinoxaden, there were no visible side effects except a large amount of barfing. A NOEL is not well established, as even at 1000 mg/kg, no effect was observed. Vomiting, apparently does not count as a side-effect.

Rats given up to 1000 mg/kg/day (for 28 days) had reduced weight gain, higher neutrophil, lymphocyte, plasma urea, bilirubin and creatinine levels in males only. Both sexes had increased phosphate, increased piss and ketone production, higher liver and kidney weights, remal tubular atrophy and decreased chloride levels.

Based on subchronic studies, the NOEL is 10 to 100 mg/kg/day.

== Environmental fate ==
In plants, pinoxaden is rapidly metabolised. The most common metabolite is undetectable after 21 days, since it will in turn have been entirely metabolised into more products.

Pinoxaden is moderately hydrophilic and has low volatility. Most pinoxaden left after harvest should become associated with the soil and insterstitial water, with some aquatic exposure from spray drift or runoff, but due to the low volatility, no significant atmospheric exposure. Pinoxaden rapidly hydrolyses, especially in basic conditions. Pinoxaden is mobile in soil, but the low application rates (15-30 g/Ha) limit any leaching. Pinoxaden's soil half-life heavily depends on pH, being 17 days at pH 5, down to 5 hours at pH 9, and typically being less than a day due to fast hydrolysis.

It is not expected to bioaccumulate in fish, and is practically non-toxic to birds, and in general to other wildlife, as the inert formulation elements (solvents, surfactants, etc) are more toxic.
