= Bromacil =

Names
- IUPAC name 5-bromo-3-(butan-2-yl)-6-methylpyrimidine-2,4(1H,3H)-dione or 5-bromo-3-sec-butyl-6-methyluracil
- Other names Bromazil, Borea, Bromax 4G, Cynogan, Uragan, 5-Bromo-6-methyl-3-(1-methylpropyl)uracil

Identifiers
| CAS Number | 314-40-9 |
| 3D model (JSmol) | Interactive image |
| ChEBI | CHEBI:3177 |
| ChemSpider | 9040 |
| ECHA InfoCard | 100.005.679 |
| EC Number | 206-245-1 |
| KEGG | C10911 |
| PubChem CID | 9411 |
| RTECS number | YQ9100000 |
| UNII | I048FFR2J0 |
| CompTox Dashboard (EPA) | DTXSID4022020 |
- InChI: InChI=1S/C9H13BrN2O2/c1-4-5(2)12-8(13)7(10)6(3)11-9(12)14/h5H,4H2,1-3H3,(H,11,14) Key: CTSLUCNDVMMDHG-UHFFFAOYSA-N; InChI=1/C9H13BrN2O2/c1-4-5(2)12-8(13)7(10)6(3)11-9(12)14/h5H,4H2,1-3H3,(H,11,14) Key: CTSLUCNDVMMDHG-UHFFFAOYAA
- SMILES: O=C1C(\Br)=C(/NC(=O)N1C(CC)C)C

Properties
| Chemical formula | C_{9}H_{13}BrN_{2}O_{2} |
| Molar mass | 261.1157 |
| Appearance | Odorless, colorless to white, crystalline solid |
| Density | 1.46 g/cm^{3} |
| Melting point | 157.5 to 160 °C (315.5 to 320.0 °F; 430.6 to 433.1 K) sublimes |
| Boiling point | none - sublimes |
| Solubility in water | 0.08% (25°C) |

Hazards
- GHS labelling
| Pictograms | (GHS07: Exclamation mark) (GHS09: Environmental hazard) |
| Signal word | Warning |
| Hazard statements | H302, H315, H319, H335, H410 |
| Precautionary statements | P261, P264, P270, P271, P273, P280, P301+P312, P302+P352, P304+P340, P305+P351+P338, P312, P321, P330, P332+P313, P337+P313, P362, P391, P403+P233, P405, P501 |
- NIOSH (US health exposure limits)
| PEL (Permissible) | none |
| REL (Recommended) | TWA 1 ppm (10 mg/m^{3}) |
| IDLH (Immediate danger) | N.D. |
- Except where otherwise noted, data are given for materials in their standard state (at 25 °C [77 °F], 100 kPa). verify (what is ?) Infobox references

Bromacil is an organic compound with the chemical formula C_{9}H_{13}BrN_{2}O_{2}, commercially available as a herbicide. Bromacil was first registered as a pesticide in the U.S. in 1961, and by 1974 1,017,000 pounds (461,000 kg) was used annually in the US, largely by government and industry. It is used for brush control on non-cropland areas. It works by interfering with photosynthesis by entering the plant through the root zone and moving throughout the plant. Bromacil is one of a group of compounds called substituted uracils. These materials are broad spectrum herbicides used for nonselective weed and brush control on non-croplands, as well as for selective weed control on a limited number of crops, such as citrus fruit and pineapple. Bromacil is also found to be excellent at controlling perennial grasses.

Bromacil's HRAC classification is Group C1, Group C (global, Aus), Group 5 (numeric), as it inhibits photosynthesis at photosystem II.

== Safety ==
There are quite a few safety precautions that should be taken when dealing with Bromacil. Dry formulations containing bromacil must bear the word "Caution" and liquid formulas must signal "Warning." Care should be exercised when spraying Bromacil on plants because it will also stop the photosynthesis of the adjacent non-target plants, therefore killing them. Bromacil should never be used in residential or recreation areas for risk of exposure. Bromacil is slightly toxic if individuals accidentally eat or touch residues and practically nontoxic if inhaled. Bromacil is a mild eye irritant and a very slight skin irritant. It is not a skin sensitizer. In studies using laboratory animals, bromacil is slightly toxic by the oral, dermal, and inhalation routes and has been placed in Toxicity Category IV (the lowest of four categories) for these effects. This herbicide should be stored in a cool, dry place and after any handling a thorough hand-washing is advised.

In regards to occupational exposure, the National Institute for Occupational Safety and Health has recommended workers handing bromacil not exceed an exposure of 1 ppm (10 mg/m^{3}) over an eight-hour time-weighted average.

== Facts ==
Bromacil (40%) is combined with the active ingredient diuron in the herbicide Krovar, which is used by companies such as the Washington State Department of Transportation (WSDOT). It is in a group of chemicals that are absorbed through the gut and excreted primarily in the urine. The half-life of bromacil in soils is about 60 days, but as long as 8 months in some conditions. Bromacil is available in granular, liquid, water-soluble liquid, and wettable powder formulations. Because bromacil is a possible human carcinogen and systemic toxicity may result from intermediate exposure (one week to several months), U.S. Environmental Protection Agency (EPA) assessed risk to workers using several major exposure scenarios. Bromacil is stable to hydrolysis under normal environmental conditions.

== Applications ==
Bromacil is applied mainly by sprayers including boom, hand-held, knapsack, compressed air, tank-type, and power sprayers. Bromacil is also applied using aerosol, shaker, or sprinkler cans. Solid forms of bromacil are spread using granule applicators and spreaders. In the United States, application using aircraft is allowed only for Special Local Need registrations to control vegetation on the Department of Defense's Yakima Firing Center in the state of Washington.
