= Quinmerac =

- Skeletal formula of quinmerac

Names
- Preferred IUPAC name 7-chloro-3-methylquinoline-8-carboxylic acid

Identifiers
CAS Number	90717-03-6
3D model (JSmol)	Interactive image
ChEBI	CHEBI:84199
ChEMBL	ChEMBL2448918
ChemSpider	82847
ECHA InfoCard	100.126.553
EC Number	402-790-6
KEGG	C18891
PubChem CID	91749
UNII	0OFY83UPMH
CompTox Dashboard (EPA)	DTXSID1042364
- InChI: InChI=1S/C11H8ClNO2/c1-6-4-7-2-3-8(12)9(11(14)15)10(7)13-5-6/h2-5H,1H3,(H,14,15) Key: ALZOLUNSQWINIR-UHFFFAOYSA-N
- SMILES: CC1=CC2=C(C(=C(C=C2)Cl)C(=O)O)N=C1

Properties
Chemical formula	C_{11}H_{8}ClNO_{2}
Molar mass	221.64 g·mol^{−1}

Hazards
- Lethal dose or concentration (LD, LC)
LD_{50} (median dose)	5 g/kg (oral, rat); 5400 mg/m3/4H (inhalation, rat) >2 gm/kg (skin, rat)
- Except where otherwise noted, data are given for materials in their standard state (at 25 °C [77 °F], 100 kPa). Infobox references

Quinmerac is a chemical herbicide first manufactured by BASF in 1993. Its formula is C_{11}H_{8}ClNO_{2}, and it is a quinolinemonocarboxylic acid that includes chlorine and methyl groups as substituents.

== Use ==
Quinmerac is used as a herbicide to control various pests, such as chickweed, that affect cereals, rape, and sugar beets. In a 2015 survey of herbicides, quinmerac was rated as having the sixth-highest market share out of the most popular herbicides used with sugar beet crops with a 7.6% share.

=== Regulation ===
Quinmerac was approved by the European Commission in 2010 to be added to the list of Authorised Plant Protection Products.

== See also ==
- HRAC classification
