= Solanesyl diphosphate synthase =

Solanesyl diphosphate synthase may refer to:

- All-trans-nonaprenyl-diphosphate synthase (geranyl-diphosphate specific), enzyme
- All-trans-nonaprenyl diphosphate synthase (geranylgeranyl-diphosphate specific), enzyme
