= EPTC (herbicide) =

Weed control herbicide

S-Ethyl dipropylthiocarbamate

Names
- Preferred IUPAC name S-Ethyl N,N-dipropylcarbamothioate
- Other names: Eptam; Epthame; S-Ethyl-N,N-dipropylthiocarbamate; S-Ethyl N,N-dipropylcarbamothioate; Carbamic acid, dipropylthio-, S-ethyl ester; S-Ethyl dipropylcarbamothioate; Dipropylcarbamothioic acid S-ethyl ester; 2-ethyl-n,n-dipropylthiocarbamate

Identifiers
CAS Number	759-94-4
3D model (JSmol)	Interactive image
ChEBI	CHEBI:4738
ChEMBL	ChEMBL1371350
ChemSpider	12428
ECHA InfoCard	100.010.976
EC Number	212-073-8
KEGG	C11081
PubChem CID	12968
UNII	R7PI3287F4
UN number	2902 2992
CompTox Dashboard (EPA)	DTXSID1024091
- InChI: InChI=1S/C9H19NOS/c1-4-7-10(8-5-2)9(11)12-6-3/h4-8H2,1-3H3 Key: GUVLYNGULCJVDO-UHFFFAOYSA-N
- SMILES: N(C(SCC)=O)(CCC)CCC

Properties
Chemical formula	C_{9}H_{19}NOS
Molar mass	189.32 g·mol^{−1}
Appearance	light yellow liquid
Odor	Aromatic, Characteristic
Density	955 kg/m^{3} at 30°C
Melting point	<25°C (<77°F)
Boiling point	232 °C (450 °F; 505 K)
Solubility in water	375 mg/L
Solubility in [[acetone, ethanol, isopropanol, benzene, xylene]]	miscible
Vapor pressure	3.2 Pa
Viscosity	5.2 mm^{2}/s

Hazards
- GHS labelling
Pictograms	(GHS07: Exclamation mark)
Hazard statements	H302
Flash point	116 °C (241 °F; 389 K)
Autoignition temperature	260 °C (500 °F; 533 K)
- Lethal dose or concentration (LD, LC)
LD_{50} (median dose)	916 mg/kg (rat, oral)
- Except where otherwise noted, data are given for materials in their standard state (at 25 °C [77 °F], 100 kPa). Infobox references

S-Ethyl dipropylthiocarbamate (EPTC) is a selective herbicide used for preëmergent control of certain grasses and broadleaf weeds in Australia and the United States. It was introduced in 1957.

EPTC can be applied preëmergently or postemergently and its effectiveness does not depend on post-application rainfall. The herbicide takes effect quickly afterward. It is registered in every US state. It should be sprayed when the soil is well worked and dry, for good mixing and incorporation. It can be stored at temperatures as low as -50 °F.

It is not persistent in soil, having a half-life of about 6 days.

== Use ==
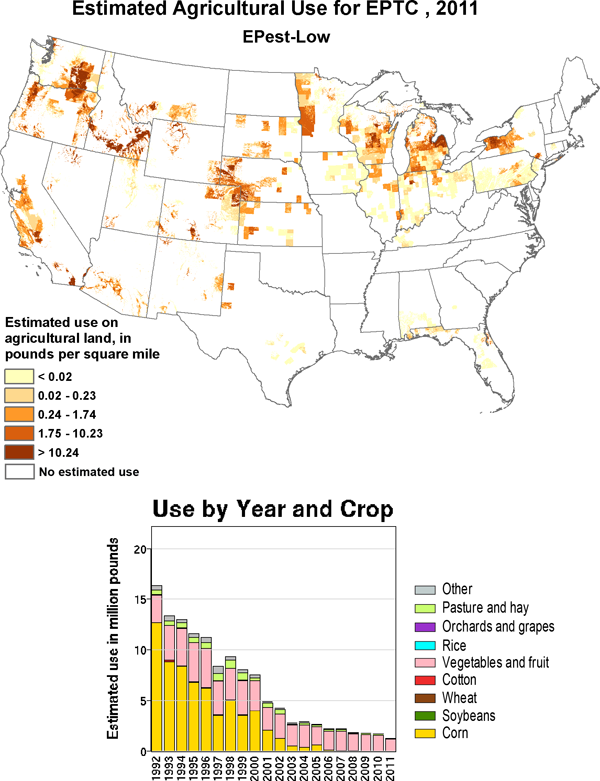
EPTC use in the United States, 2011

EPTC is applied at 2 to 7.5 lbs/ac in the US, or 2.5-5 kg/ha in Australia, measured by active ingredient. It is usually sold as an emulsifiable concentrate, of 70% or greater concentration, or as granules.

In 2001, 277,000 lbs (123 tonnes) of EPTC was used in California.

== Registrations ==
EPTC is registered in Australia, South Africa and the USA.

In the United States, EPTC is registered for use on alfalfa, almonds, beans, birdsfoot trefoil, clovers, lespedeza, sainfoin, citrus nursery stock and plantings, cotton, grass, fallow, pine seedlings, potatoes, safflower, sugar beets, sunflower, tomatoes and walnuts.

In Australia, EPTC is used on beans, potatoes, maize, sweet corn, safflower, rapeseed, sunflower, lucerne, duboisia, lotus, non-crop situations and grass.

The EU does not allow the use of EPTC.

== Safety ==
The EPA says in a 1999 report that EPTC produced no developmental or reproductive toxicity, and there was no cause for concern. Nevertheless, the State of California OEHHA is concerned that EPTC could be developmentally toxic.

== Chemical Properties ==
It has a boiling point of 127°C (261°F) at a pressure of 20 mmHg, and is miscible with acetone, ethanol, kerosene, xylene and 4-methylpentan-2-one.

== Tradenames ==
EPTC has been sold under the tradenames Alirox, Eradicane, Eptam, Genep, Niptan, Shortstop, Torbin and Witox. The long-running "Eptam" trademark is the Stauffer Chemical Company's.
