= Thiocarbamate =

Organosulfur compounds of the forms ROC(S)NR2 or RSC(O)NR2

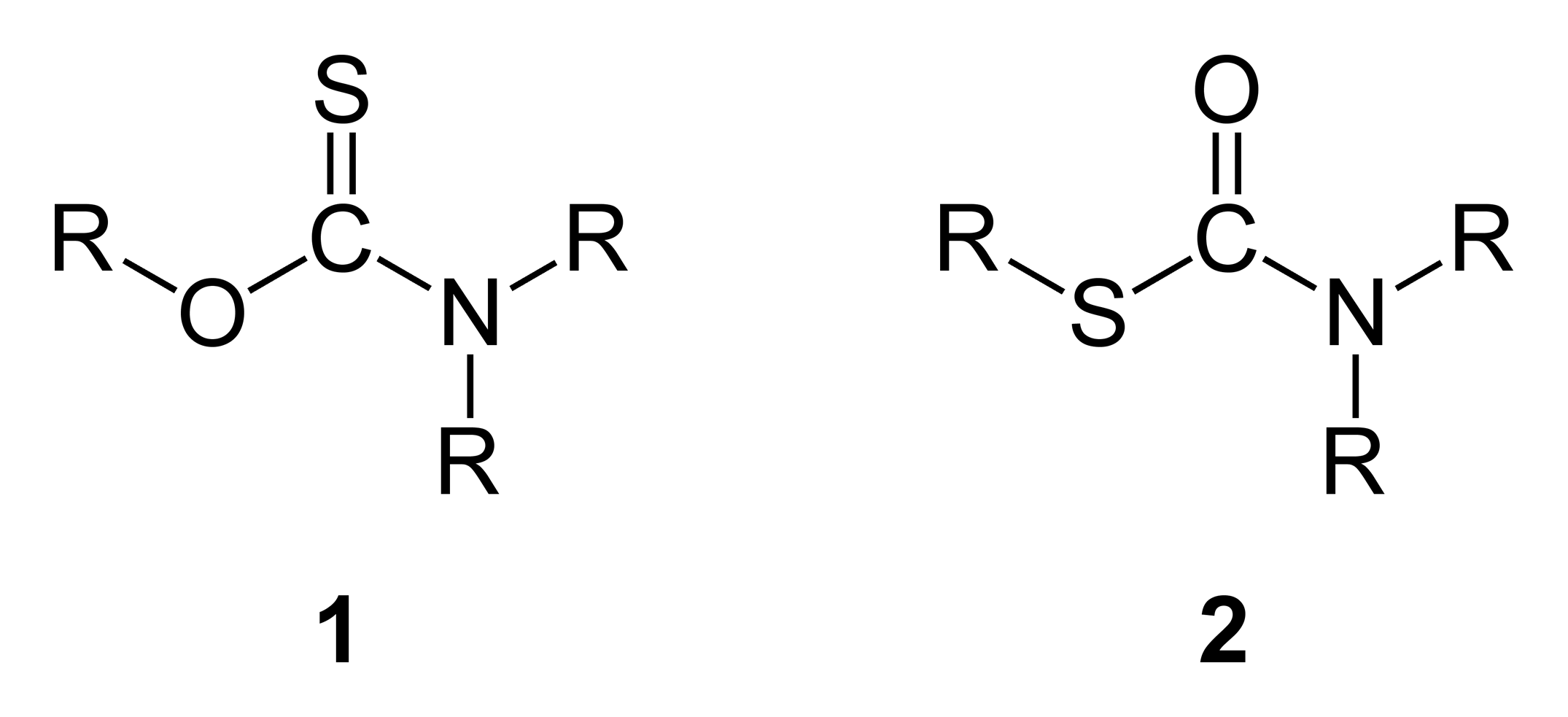
General structural formulae of O-organyl (1) and S-organyl (2) thiocarbamates

In organic chemistry, thiocarbamates (thiourethanes) are a family of organosulfur compounds. As the prefix thio- suggests, they are sulfur analogues of carbamates. There are two isomeric forms of thiocarbamates: O-thiocarbamates, ROC(=S)NR_{2} (esters), and S-thiocarbamates, RSC(=O)NR_{2} (thioesters).

== Synthesis ==
Thiocarbamates can be synthesised by the reaction of water or (secondary or tertiary) alcohols upon thiocyanates, the Riemschneider thiocarbamate synthesis:

RSCN + H_{2}O → RSC(=O)NH_{2}
RSCN + R'OH → RSC(=O)NR'H

Similar reactions are seen between alcohols and thiocarbamoyl chlorides such as dimethylthiocarbamoyl chloride; as well as between thiols and cyanates. The herbicide Cycloate is produced in this way:

C_{6}H_{11}(C_{2}H_{5})NCOCl + C_{2}H_{5}SH → C_{6}H_{11}(C_{2}H_{5})NCOSC_{2}H_{5} + HCl

Other related thiocarbamate herbicides include vernolate (C_{3}H_{7})_{2}NCOSC_{3}H_{7} and triallate ((i−C_{3}H_{7})_{2}NCOSCH_{2}CCl=CCl_{2}.

Salts of thiocarbamate arise by the reaction of amines with carbonyl sulfide:

2 R_{2}NH + COS → [R_{2}NH^{+}_{2}][R_{2}N−COS^{−}]

== Reactions ==
In the Newman-Kwart rearrangement O-thiocarbamates can isomerise to S-thiocarbamates. This reaction, which generally requires high temperatures, is an important method for the synthesis of thiophenols.

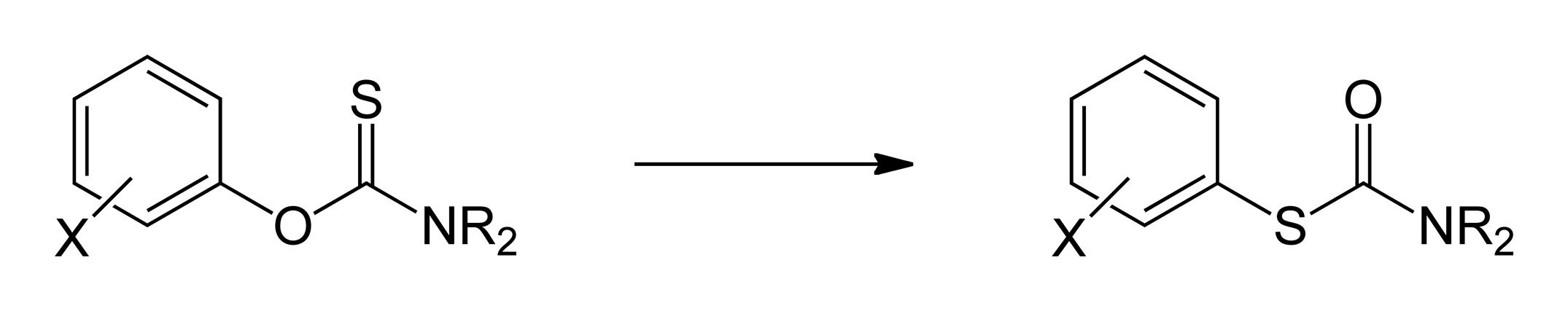

== Occurrence ==
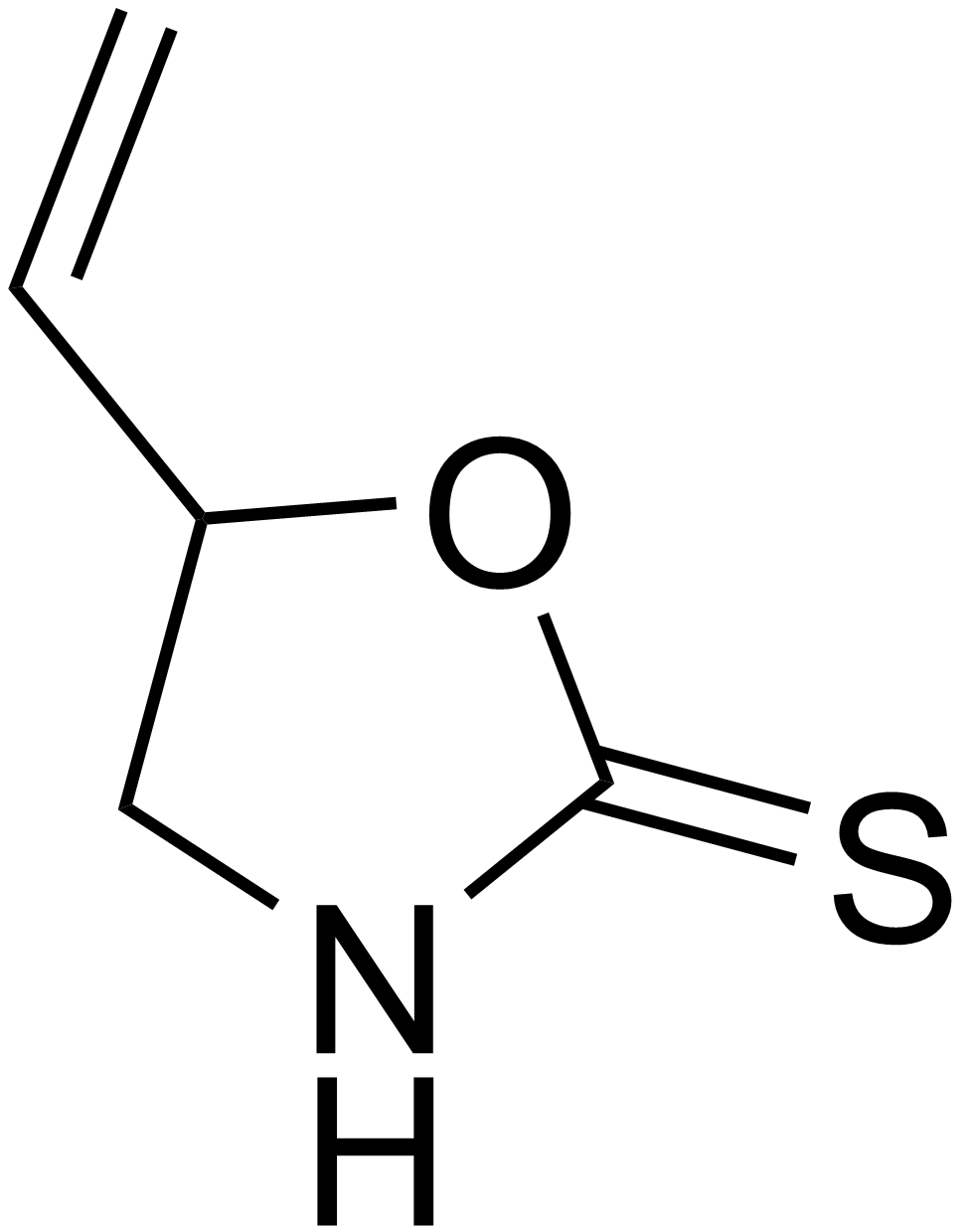
Chemical structure of goitrin

Goitrin is a cyclic thiocarbamate found in some vegetables.

== Uses ==
Thiocarbamate based herbicides (e.g. prosulfocarb) were introduced in 1957 and in 2017 was a $200,000,000 market. Other thiocarbamate herbicides are pebulate, molinate, EPTC, butylate, triallate, vernolate and cycloate.

== See also ==
- Dithiocarbamate
- Carbamate
- Tolnaftate, a thiocarbamate used as an antifungal agent
