= Chlorthal =

Chemical compound

- Skeletal formula of chlorthal

Names
- Preferred IUPAC name 2,3,5,6-tetrachloroterephthalic acid
- Other names: Tetrachloroterephthalic acid; Perchloroterephthalic acid

Identifiers
CAS Number	2136-79-0
3D model (JSmol)	Interactive image
ChEBI	CHEBI:179164
ChemSpider	15635
ECHA InfoCard	100.203.551
EC Number	678-503-5
PubChem CID	16493
UNII	96C2WU8832
CompTox Dashboard (EPA)	DTXSID3039400
- InChI: InChI=1S/C8H2Cl4O4/c9-3-1(7(13)14)4(10)6(12)2(5(3)11)8(15)16/h(H,13,14)(H,15,16) Key: KZCBXHSWMMIEQU-UHFFFAOYSA-N
- SMILES: C1(=C(C(=C(C(=C1Cl)Cl)C(=O)O)Cl)Cl)C(=O)O

Properties
Chemical formula	C_{8}H_{2}Cl_{4}O_{4}
Molar mass	303.90 g·mol^{−1}

Hazards
- GHS labelling
Pictograms	(GHS07: Exclamation mark)
Signal word	Warning
Hazard statements	H315, H319
Precautionary statements	P264, P264+P265, P280, P302+P352, P305+P351+P338, P321, P332+P317, P337+P317, P362+P364
- Except where otherwise noted, data are given for materials in their standard state (at 25 °C [77 °F], 100 kPa). Infobox references

Chlorthal is an herbicide. Its formula is C_{8}H_{2}Cl_{4}O_{4}. It is a derivative of terephthalic acid. The chemical is used more often in agricultural settings than it is in household weed treatment.
