= Wild turnip =

Wild turnip is a common name for several plants and may refer to:

- Arisaema triphyllum, native to forests of eastern North America, with a toxic corm
- Brassica rapa, the cultivated turnip species, which has been introduced throughout the world
- Pediomelum esculentum, syn. Psoralea esculenta, native to prairies of central North America, with an edible tuber
