= Benthiocarb =

Names
- Preferred IUPAC name S-[(4-Chlorophenyl)methyl] diethylcarbamothioate
- Other names Thiobencarb, Saturn, Bolero

Identifiers
CAS Number	28249-77-6
3D model (JSmol)	Interactive image
ChEMBL	ChEMBL388559
ChemSpider	31512
ECHA InfoCard	100.044.461
KEGG	C14428
PubChem CID	34192
UNII	90LN6Y7I7H
CompTox Dashboard (EPA)	DTXSID6024337
- InChI: InChI=1S/C12H16ClNOS/c1-3-14(4-2)12(15)16-9-10-5-7-11(13)8-6-10/h5-8H,3-4,9H2,1-2H3 Key: QHTQREMOGMZHJV-UHFFFAOYSA-N; InChI=1S/C12H16ClNOS/c1-3-14(4-2)12(15)16-9-10-5-7-11(13)8-6-10/h5-8H,3-4,9H2,1-2H3
- SMILES: Clc1ccc(cc1)CSC(=O)N(CC)CC

Properties
Chemical formula	C_{12}H_{16}ClNOS
Molar mass	257.78 g·mol^{−1}
Appearance	Pale yellow to brownish-yellow liquid
Density	1.145-1.180 g cm^{−3} at 20 °C
Melting point	3.3 °C (37.9 °F; 276.4 K)
Boiling point	126 to 129 °C (259 to 264 °F; 399 to 402 K) at 0.008 Torr
Solubility in water	28.0 mg/L at 25 °C
Solubility	Readily soluble in: acetone, ethanol, xylene, methanol, benzene, n-hexane, and acetonitrile
log P	3.42 (octanol/water)

Hazards
NFPA 704 (fire diamond)	4 1 0
Flash point	165.8 °C (330.4 °F; 438.9 K)
- Lethal dose or concentration (LD, LC)
LD_{50} (median dose)	Rat, oral 1300 mg/kg Mouse, oral 560 mg/kg
- Except where otherwise noted, data are given for materials in their standard state (at 25 °C [77 °F], 100 kPa). verify (what is ?) Infobox references

Benthiocarb is a thiocarbamate cholinesterase inhibitor used as an herbicide. Benthiocarb is almost always used to control the weeds around rice crops, but its effectiveness is not specific to just rice crops. The benthiocarb molecule is an organic molecule containing a phenol bonded to a chlorine atom.

It is registered as a herbicide in India, and Uganda.

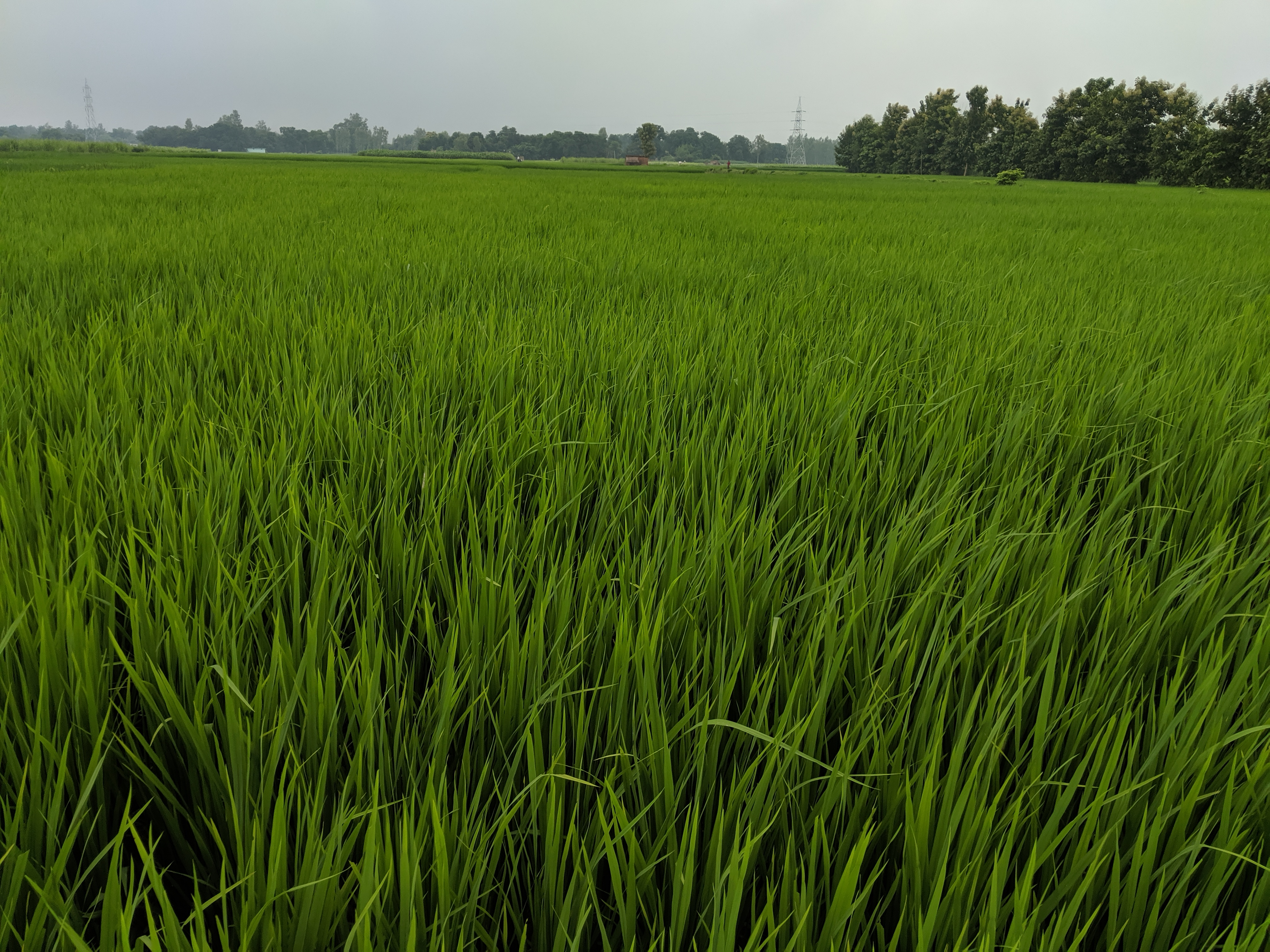
Benthiocarb is a major herbicide for rice crops

== See also ==
- Thiocarbamate
