= Bentazon =

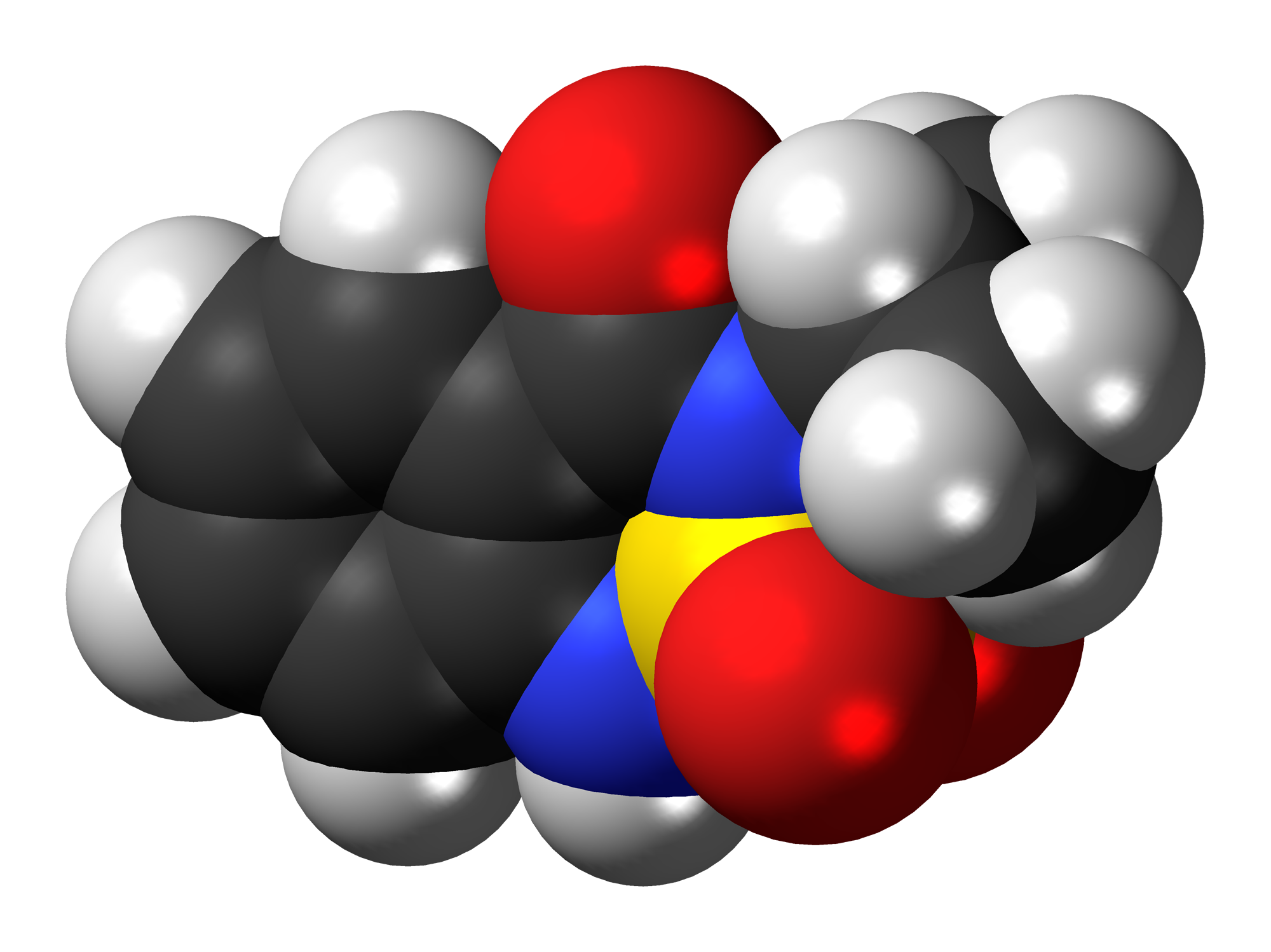

Names
- Preferred IUPAC name 3-(Propan-2-yl)-2λ^{6},1,3-benzothiadiazine-2,2,4(1H,3H)-trione

Identifiers
CAS Number	25057-89-0
3D model (JSmol)	Interactive image
ChEBI	CHEBI:3018
ChEMBL	ChEMBL1567045
ChemSpider	2238
ECHA InfoCard	100.042.335
PubChem CID	2328
UNII	R4S7ZGZ9CT
CompTox Dashboard (EPA)	DTXSID0023901
- InChI: InChI=1S/C10H12N2O3S/c1-7(2)12-10(13)8-5-3-4-6-9(8)11-16(12,14)15/h3-7,11H,1-2H3 Key: ZOMSMJKLGFBRBS-UHFFFAOYSA-N; InChI=1/C10H12N2O3S/c1-7(2)12-10(13)8-5-3-4-6-9(8)11-16(12,14)15/h3-7,11H,1-2H3 Key: ZOMSMJKLGFBRBS-UHFFFAOYAA
- SMILES: O=C1N(C(C)C)S(=O)(=O)Nc2ccccc12

Properties
Chemical formula	C_{10}H_{12}N_{2}O_{3}S
Molar mass	240.28 g·mol^{−1}
Density	1.41 g/cm^{3}
Melting point	137 to 140 °C (279 to 284 °F; 410 to 413 K)
- Except where otherwise noted, data are given for materials in their standard state (at 25 °C [77 °F], 100 kPa). Infobox references

Bentazon, or Bentazone, is a herbicide active ingredient. It is selective. Chemically, it is a thiadiazine. Sodium bentazon is available commercially as "Basagran", "Herbatox", "Leader" and "Laddock" and is coloured slightly brown.

Bentazon is a Group C / C3 / 6 (Australian, Global, numeric) herbicide under the HRAC classification.

== Usage ==
Bentazon controls plants unable to metabolise it. It is considered safe for use on alfalfa, beans (except garbanzo beans), maize, peanuts, peas (with the exception of blackeyed peas), pepper, peppermint, rice, sorghum, soybeans and spearmint; as well as lawns and turf. Bentazon is usually applied aerially or through contact spraying. Bentazon in high heat can give off sulfur and nitrogen fumes.

Bentazon is registered in the US. In 2010 the formulations "Prompt" and "Laddock", both mixtures of bentazon and atrazine, were voluntarily cancelled, though other bentazone products remain available as of 2025.

== Environmental behaviour ==
Bentazon is quickly metabolized by plants and animals. Soil leaching and runoff may cause water contamination. In 1995 the EPA found bentazon in water "exceeding levels of concern". Bentazone is not regulated by the Safe Drinking Water Act. Bentazon was detectable in 64 out of 200 wells in California - the highest number of detections in a 1995 study. In response, California set a bentazon limit in drinking water of 200 ppb (parts per billion).

The EPA forbids application and disposal of bentazon directly into water, just like nearly every single other pesticide also.

== Ecotoxicity ==
Bentazon is non-toxic to honeybees and beetles. It is toxic to rainbow trout and bluegill sunfish at 190 ppm and 616 ppm, respectively. Bentazon affects birds' reproductive capacities.

To mammals, bentazon is moderately toxic if ingested or absorbed through skin. The LD_{50} is 500 mg/kg for cats, 1100 mg/kg to 2063 mg/kg for rats, 400 mg/kg for mice, and 750 mg/kg for rabbits. Dogs, fed 13.1 mg/day, developed diarrhoea, anemia and dehydration. In another study, dogs developed prostate inflammation also. Bentazon does not cause gene mutations.

== Toxicity to humans ==
Bentazon is non-carcinogenic to humans, based on animal tests. However, there have been no studies on humans. Bentazon can irritate the eyes, skin and respiratory tract; ingesting bentazon causes nausea, diarrhoea, trembling, vomiting and difficulty breathing.

The toxic effects have been seen in humans who killed themselves with bentazon: it caused fevers, renal failure, accelerated heart rate, shortness of breath and hyperthermia. Eating 88 grams of bentazon killed an adult.

Food limits

Food limits are set on bentazon prevent toxic effects. In the US: 0.02 ppm for milk; 0.05 ppm for meat and animal products; 0.05 ppm for dried beans (except soy), corn, bohemian chili peppers, peanuts, rice, soybeans, and sorghum used for fodder and grain; 0.5 ppm for succulent beans and peas; 0.3 ppm for peanut hulls; 1 ppm for mint and dried peas; 3 ppm for rice (straw), and corn and peanuts used in hay or forage; 8 ppm for pea vine hays (dried), and soybeans used for foraging or hay.
