= Wireweed =

Wireweed may refer to several organisms, including:

- Amphibolis, a genus of marine flowering plants in the family Cymodoceaceae
- Polygonella, a genus of flowering plants in the knotweed and smartweed family, Polygonaceae.
- Rigiopappus leptocladus, a species of flowering plant in the daisy family, Asteraceae.
- Sargassum muticum, also known as the Japanese wireweed, is a large brown seaweed of the genus Sargassum.
- Sida (plant), a genus of flowering herbs and subshrubs in the mallow family, Malvaceae.
