= Annual ryegrass =

Annual ryegrass is a common name for several species of ryegrass and may refer to:

- Lolium multiflorum, known as "annual ryegrass" in the United States, Canada and the United Kingdom and grown as a cover crop
- Lolium rigidum, known as "Wimmera ryegrass" in Australia, and considered a weed when present as a contaminant in field crops but is quite productive for livestock grazing
