= Broadleaf weeds =

Unwanted tough plants that may grow in lawns and gardens

Broadleaf weeds are dicotyledonous weeds that may grow in lawns, gardens or yards. As forbs, they can be easy to spot when growing among grasses. They are tougher than grassy monocot weeds, multiply with ease, and can be very hard to eradicate.

== Basic characteristics ==
Broadleaf weeds can emerge annually, biennially, or perennially, making consistent management difficult. Perennial weeds are often very difficult to control as the weeds regenerate faster than they can be eradicated. Broadleaf weeds, as their name suggests, often have wide leaves and grow from a stem. Most broadleaf weeds develop clusters of blossoms or single flowers as they mature that can be considered undesirable.

The roots of most broadleaf weeds are fibrous in nature. The roots can be thin, a large taproot, or a combination. Many broadleaf weeds spread through their seeds and rhizomes, although some only spread through seeds.

Popular broadleaf weeds are chickweed, clover, dandelion, wild geranium, ivy, milkweed, plantain (broadleaf), and thistle.

== Contrast with grassy weeds ==
The differences in broadleaf weeds' structure and growth habits make them easy to distinguish from narrow-leaved weedy grasses. Most broadleaf weeds have leaves with net-like veins and nodes that contain one or more leaves, and they may have showy flowers, while grassy weeds appear as a single leaf from a germinated seed. Furthermore, grassy weeds are different because they may initially appear like desirable grasses.

== Control methods ==
Although broadleaf weeds can grow aggressively, they can be controlled via different methods.

When there are few broadleaf weeds present, an effective approach is hand-pulling. This should be carried out regularly to check the spread of weeds. In a thick lawn that is overgrown with broadleaf weeds, a lawn mower may be necessary.

When there are abundant broadleaf weeds, a chemical herbicide (weed killer) can be useful. There are chemical herbicides meant for controlling broadleaf weeds. Perennial broadleaf weeds are often controlled with chemical herbicides, although they can sometimes return after several months.

Broadleaf weeds can be controlled by shading them out. This involves covering the affected area with flat materials such as boards, nylon, or plastic sheets, blocking the weeds' access to sunlight and water and killing them.
