= Pesticide formulation =

Constituents of pesticides

The biological activity of a pesticide, be it chemical or biological in nature, is determined by its active ingredient (AI - also called the active substance). Pesticide products very rarely consist of the pure active ingredient. The AI is usually formulated with other materials (adjuvents and co-formulants) and this is the product as sold, but it may be further diluted in use. Formulations improve the properties of a chemical for handling, storage, application and may substantially influence effectiveness and safety.

Formulation types are categorised into two-letter international formulation codes: (e.g. GR: granules), which must be used when registering a new pesticide product. Croplife maintains this list, which in the 7th update (2017) contains 65 formulation codes and 29 codes which are no longer used.

Household formulations are often "low-concentrate solutions", with pesticides pre-diluted, often to 1% active ingredient or less, and at much steeper prices compared to more concentrated commercial formulations.

== Water-miscible formulations ==
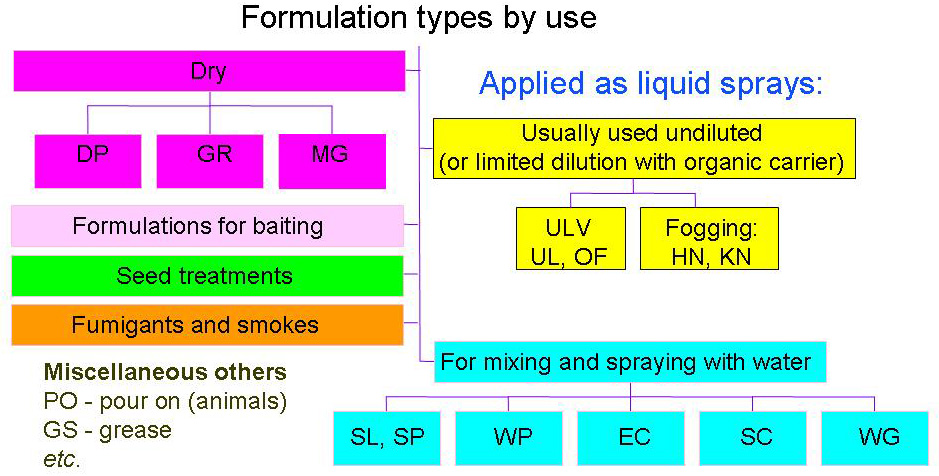

By far the most frequently used products are formulations for mixing with water then applying as sprays. Water miscible formulation types include:

- EC Emulsifiable concentrate
- SL Soluble (liquid) concentrate
- SP Soluble powder
- WP Wettable powder

Newer formulations with less use of hazardous solvents include:

- SC Suspension concentrate
- CS Capsule suspensions
- WG Water dispersible granules

== Other formulations ==
Other common formulations include granules (GR) and dusts (DP), although for improved safety the latter have been replaced by microgranules (MG e.g. for rice farmers in Japan). Specialist formulations are available for ultra-low volume spraying, fogging, fumigation, etc. Very occasionally, some pesticides (e.g. malathion) may be sold as technical material (TC - which is mostly AI, but also contains small quantities of, usually non-active, by-products of the manufacturing process; TGAC - "technical grade active constituent" means the same.).

A particularly efficient form of pesticide dose transfer is seed treatment and specific formulations have been developed for this purpose. A number of pesticide bait formulations are available for rodent pest control, etc.

== See also ==
- Formulations
- Pharmaceutical formulation
- Galenic formulation
