= List of herbicides =

This is a list of herbicides. These are chemical compounds which have been registered as herbicides. The names on the list are the ISO common name for the active ingredient which is formulated into the branded product sold to end-users. The University of Hertfordshire maintains a database of the chemical and biological properties of these materials, including their brand names and the countries and dates where and when they have been introduced. The industry-sponsored Herbicide Resistance Action Committee (HRAC) advises on the use of herbicides in crop protection and classifies the available compounds according to their chemical structures and mechanism of action so as to manage the risks of pesticide resistance developing. The 2024 HRAC poster of herbicide modes of action includes the majority of chemicals listed below. The British Crop Production Council also publishes information on ISO common names of new pesticides.

The Weed Science Society of America also classifies herbicides by their mechanism of action using the HRAC classification system.

== 0-9 ==
- 2,3,6-TBA
- 2,4,5-T
- 4-(2,4,5-trichlorophenoxy)butanoic acid
- 2,4-D
- 2,4-DB
- 2-(2,4-dichlorophenoxy)ethyl benzoate
- 2,4-DEP
- (3,4-dichlorophenoxy)acetic acid
- 4-(3,4-dichlorophenoxy)butanoic acid
- 2-(3,4-dichlorophenoxy)propanoic acid
- 4-CPA
- 4-(4-chlorophenoxy)butanoic acid
- 4-CPP

== A ==
- acetochlor
- acifluorfen
- aclonifen
- acrolein
- alachlor
- allidochlor
- alloxydim
- allyl isothiocyanate
- alorac
- ametridione
- ametryn
- amibuzin
- amicarbazone
- amidochlor
- amidosulfuron
- aminocyclopyrachlor
- aminopyralid
- amiprofos-methyl
- amiprophos
- amitrole
- ammonium sulfamate
- anilofos
- anisuron
- asulam
- atraton
- atrazine
- azafenidin
- azimsulfuron
- aziprotryne

== B ==
- barban (herbicide)
- BCPC
- beflubutamid
- benazolin
- bencarbazone
- benfluralin
- benfuresate
- benquitrione
- bensulfuron
- bensulide
- bentazone
- bentranil
- benzadox
- benzfendizone
- benzipram
- benzobicyclon
- benzofenap
- benzofluor
- benzoylprop
- benzthiazuron
- bicyclopyrone
- bifenox
- bilanafos
- bipyrazone
- bipyribicyclone
- bispyribac
- bixlozone
- borax
- broclozone
- bromacil
- bromobonil
- bromobutide
- bromofenoxim
- bromoxynil
- brompyrazon
- butachlor
- butafenacil
- butamifos
- butenachlor
- buthidazole
- buthiuron
- butralin
- butroxydim
- buturon
- butylate

== C ==
- cacodylic acid
- cafenstrole
- calcium chlorate
- cambendichlor
- carbasulam
- carbetamide
- carboxazole
- carfentrazone
- 2-chloro-N,N-diethylacetamide
- CEPC
- chlomethoxyfen
- chloramben
- chloranocryl
- chlorazifop
- chlorazine
- chlorbromuron
- chlorbufam
- chloreturon
- chlorfenac
- chlorfenprop
- chlorflurazole
- chloridazon
- chlorimuron
- chlornidine
- chlornitrofen
- chloroacetic acid
- chloropon
- chlorotoluron
- chloroxuron
- chloroxynil
- chlorphthalim
- chlorpropham
- chlorsulfuron
- chlorthal
- chlorthiamid
- cinflubrolin
- cinidon-ethyl
- cinmethylin
- cinosulfuron
- cisanilide
- clacyfos
- clethodim
- cliodinate
- clodinafop
- clofop
- clomazone
- clomeprop
- cloprop
- cloproxydim
- clopyralid
- cloransulam
- calcium bis(hydrogen methylarsonate)
- CPMF
- CPPC
- credazine
- cresol
- cumyluron
- cyanamide
- cyanatryn
- cyanazine
- cyanogen
- cycloate
- cyclopyranil
- cyclopyrimorate
- cyclosulfamuron
- cycloxydim
- cycluron
- cyhalofop
- cyperquat
- cyprazine
- cyprazole
- cypromid
- cypyrafluone

== D ==
- daimuron
- dalapon
- dazomet
- DCMU
- defenuron
- delachlor
- desmedipham
- desmetryn
- di-allate
- dicamba
- dichlobenil
- dichlobenz-methyl
- dichloralurea
- dichlormate
- dichlorprop
- diclofop
- diclosulam
- diethamquat
- diethatyl
- difenopenten
- difenoxuron
- difenzoquat
- diflufenican
- diflufenzopyr
- dimefuron
- dimepiperate
- dimepyrolimet
- dimesulfazet
- dimethachlor
- dimethametryn
- dimethenamid
- dimethyl disulfide
- dimexano
- dimidazon
- dinitramine
- dinitro-ortho-cresol
- dinofenate
- dinoprop
- dinosam
- dinoseb
- dinoterb
- dioxopyritrione
- diphenamid
- dipropalin
- dipropetryn
- diquat
- disodium methyl arsonate
- disul
- dithiopyr
- dithiuron
- diuron
- DMPA

== E ==
- EBEP
- eglinazine
- endothal
- epronaz
- EPTC
- epyrifenacil
- erbon
- erlujixiancaoan
- esprocarb
- ethachlor
- ethalfluralin
- ethametsulfuron
- ethaprochlor
- ethidimuron
- ethiolate
- ethiozin
- ethofumesate
- ethoxyfen
- ethoxysulfuron
- etinofen
- etnipromid
- etobenzanid
- EXD

== F ==
- famoxacarb
- fenasulam
- fendioxypyracil
- fenoprop
- fenoxaprop
- fenoxasulfone
- fenpyrazone
- fenquinotrione
- fenteracol
- fenthiaprop
- fentrazamide
- fenuron
- feproxydim
- ferrous sulfate
- flamprop
- flazasulfuron
- florasulam
- florpyrauxifen
- fluazifop
- fluazolate
- flucarbazone
- flucetosulfuron
- fluchloralin
- fluchloraminopyr
- flufenacet
- flufenauxirim
- flufenazopyr
- flufenican
- flufenoximacil
- flufenpyr
- flumetsulam
- flumezin
- flumiclorac
- flumioxazin
- flumipropyn
- fluometuron
- fluorodifen
- fluoroglycofen
- fluoromidine
- fluoronitrofen
- fluothiuron
- flupoxam
- flupropacil
- flupropanate
- flupyrsulfuron
- fluridone
- flurochloridone
- fluroxypyr
- flurtamone
- flusulfinam
- fluthiacet
- fomesafen
- foramsulfuron
- fosamine
- fucaojing
- fucaomi
- funaihecaoling
- furyloxyfen

== G ==
- glufosinate
- glyphosate

== H ==
- halauxifen
- halosafen
- halosulfuron
- haloxydine
- haloxyfop
- herbimycin
- hexachloroacetone
- hexaflurate
- hexazinone
- huancaiwo
- huangcaoling

== I ==
- icafolin
- imazamethabenz
- imazamox
- imazapic
- imazapyr
- imazaquin
- imazethapyr
- imazosulfuron
- indanofan
- indaziflam
- indolauxipyr
- iodobonil
- iodosulfuron
- iofensulfuron
- ioxynil
- ipazine
- ipfencarbazone
- iprymidam
- iptriazopyrid
- isocarbamid
- isocil
- isomethiozin
- isonoruron
- isopolinate
- isopropalin
- isoproturon
- isouron
- isoxaben
- isoxacarbole
- isoxachlortole
- isoxafenacil
- isoxaflutole
- isoxapyrifop

== K ==
- karbutilate
- karsil
- ketospiradox
- kuicaoxi

== L ==
- lactofen
- lancotrione
- lenacil
- linuron

== M ==
- MAA
- MAMA
- MCPA
- MCPB
- mecoprop
- medinoterb
- mefenacet
- mefluidide
- mesoprazine
- mesosulfuron
- mesotrione
- metam
- metamifop
- metamitron
- metazachlor
- metazosulfuron
- metflurazon
- methabenzthiazuron
- methalpropalin
- methazole
- methiobencarb
- methiopyrisulfuron
- methiozolin
- methiuron
- methometon
- methoprotryne
- methoxyphenone
- methyldymron
- metobenzuron
- metobromuron
- metolachlor
- metosulam
- metoxuron
- metproxybicyclone
- metribuzin
- metsulfuron
- molinate
- monalide
- monisouron
- monolinuron
- monosulfuron
- monuron
- morfamquat
- MSMA

== N ==
- naproanilide
- napropamide
- naptalam
- neburon
- nicosulfuron
- nipyraclofen
- nitralin
- nitrofen
- nitrofluorfen
- norflurazon
- nitrofor
- noruron

== O ==
- OCH
- o-dichlorobenzene
- orbencarb
- orthosulfamuron
- oryzalin
- oxadiargyl
- oxadiazon
- oxapyrazon
- oxasulfuron
- oxaziclomefone
- oxyfluorfen

== P ==
- parafluron
- paraquat
- pebulate
- pelargonic acid
- pendiclofenate
- pendimethalin
- penoxsulam
- pentachlorophenol
- pentanochlor
- pentoxazone
- perfluidone
- pethoxamid
- phenisopham
- phenmedipham
- phenobenzuron
- phenoxy herbicides
- phenylmercury acetate
- picloram
- picolinafen
- pinoxaden
- piperophos
- potassium arsenite
- potassium azide
- potassium cyanate
- pretilachlor
- primisulfuron
- prochlorosulfone
- procyazine
- prodiamine
- profluazol
- profluralin
- profoxydim
- proglinazine
- prometon
- prometryn
- propachlor
- propanil
- propaquizafop
- propazine
- propham
- propisochlor
- propoxycarbazone
- propyrisulfuron
- propyzamide
- prosulfalin
- prosulfocarb
- prosulfuron
- proxan
- prynachlor
- pydanon
- pyraclonil
- pyraflufen
- pyraquinate
- pyrasulfotole
- pyrazolynate
- pyrazosulfuron
- pyrazoxyfen
- pyribambenz-isopropyl
- pyribambenz-propyl
- pyribenzoxim
- pyributicarb
- pyriclor
- pyridafol
- pyridate
- pyriflubenzoxim
- pyriftalid
- pyriminobac
- pyrimisulfan
- pyrithiobac
- pyroxasulfone
- pyroxsulam

== Q ==
- quinclorac
- quinmerac
- quinoclamine
- quinonamid
- quintrione
- quizalofop

== R ==
- rhodethanil
- rimisoxafen
- rimsulfuron

== S ==
- saflufenacil
- sebuthylazine
- secbumeton
- sethoxydim
- shuangjiaancaolin
- siduron
- simazine
- simeton
- simetryn
- sodium arsenite
- sodium azide
- sodium chlorate
- sulcotrione
- sulfallate
- sulfathiadiazuron
- sulfentrazone
- sulfometuron
- sulfosulfuron
- sulfuric acid
- sulglycapin
- swep

== T ==
- tavron
- TCA
- tebutam
- tebuthiuron
- tefuryltrione
- tembotrione
- tepraloxydim
- terbacil
- terbucarb
- terbuchlor
- terbumeton
- terbuthylazine
- terbutryn
- tetflupyrolimet
- tetrafluron
- thenylchlor
- thiazafluron
- thiazopyr
- thidiazimin
- thidiazuron
- thiencarbazone
- thifensulfuron
- thiobencarb
- tiafenacil
- tiocarbazil
- tioclorim
- tolpyralate
- topramezone
- toxapyzone
- tralkoxydim
- triafamone
- triallate
- triasulfuron
- triaziflam
- triazofenamide
- tribenuron
- tricamba
- triclopyr
- tridiphane
- trietazine
- trifloxysulfuron
- trifludimoxazin
- triflupyroxazin
- trifluralin
- triflusulfuron
- trifop
- trifopsime
- trihydroxytriazine
- trimefluor
- trimeturon
- tripropindan
- tripyrasulfone
- tritac
- tritosulfuron

== V ==
- vernolate

== X ==
- xylachlor
- xyloxadine

== Z ==
- zuomihuanglong

== See also ==
- List of fungicides
- List of insecticides
- Category:Herbicides by numeric HRAC
