= BCPC =

BCPC may refer to:

- British Crop Production Council
- Provincial Court of British Columbia
- BCPC (herbicide)
