= C10H19N5O =

The molecular formula C_{10}H_{19}N_{5}O (molar mass: 225.29 g/mol) may refer to:

- Prometon
- Terbumeton
