= Quizalofop-P-ethyl =

Weed control herbicide

Names
- IUPAC name Ethyl (R)-2-[4-(6-chloroquinoxalin-2-yloxy)phenoxy]propionate
- Other names Ethyl (2R)-2-(4-((6-chloro-2-quinoxalinyl)oxy)phenoxy)propanoate

Identifiers
CAS Number	100646-51-3
3D model (JSmol)	Interactive image
ChEBI	CHEBI:137938
ChEMBL	ChEMBL3138620
ChemSpider	1299878
ECHA InfoCard	100.132.447
PubChem CID	1617113
UNII	1U4923B12R
CompTox Dashboard (EPA)	DTXSID0034857
- InChI: InChI=1S/C19H17ClN2O4/c1-3-24-19(23)12(2)25-14-5-7-15(8-6-14)26-18-11-21-17-10-13(20)4-9-16(17)22-18/h4-12H,3H2,1-2H3/t12-/m1/s1 Key: OSUHJPCHFDQAIT-GFCCVEGCSA-N
- SMILES: CCOC(=O)C(C)OC1=CC=C(C=C1)OC2=CN=C3C=C(C=CC3=N2)Cl

Properties
Chemical formula	C_{19}H_{17}ClN_{2}O_{4}
Molar mass	372.81 g·mol^{−1}
Appearance	White crystalline powder
Melting point	75 °C (167 °F; 348 K)
Boiling point	Degrades at 320 °C (607 °F)
Solubility in water	0.61 mg/L
Solubility in acetone	250 g/L

Hazards
- Occupational safety and health (OHS/OSH)
Main hazards	Moderate human toxicity, toxic to fish
- GHS labelling
Pictograms	(GHS09: Environmental hazard)
Hazard statements	H301
- Lethal dose or concentration (LD, LC)
LD_{50} (median dose)	1182 - 1670 mg/kg (rat, oral)
LC_{50} (median concentration)	5.8 mg/L (rat, inhalation, 4 hours); LC₅₀/96 h: 10.7 mg/L (rainbow trout)

Related compounds
Related compounds	Quizalofop, Kuicaoxi
- Except where otherwise noted, data are given for materials in their standard state (at 25 °C [77 °F], 100 kPa). Infobox references

Quizalofop-P-ethyl (QPE) is a herbicidal chemical, the most common form of quizalofop. In practice the terms are sometimes interchanged, although there are also quizalofop-ethyl and quizalofop-P-tefuryl which are also variants of quizalofop. It is an aryloxyphenoxypropionate.

QPE is racemic, and it is the more active enantimer of quizalofop-ethyl.

Quizalofop-P-ethyl's HRAC classification is Group A (Australia and global), or Group 1 (numeric). Group A herbicides inhibit acetyl CoA carboxylase, (ACCase).

QPE is approved for use in Australia, all of the European Union, Morocco and China.
