= Cyclohexane-1,2-dione hydrolase =

Class of enzymes

Identifiers
- EC no.: 3.7.1.11

Databases
- BRENDA: enzyme data
- ExPASy: NiceZyme view
- KEGG: enzyme entry
- MetaCyc: metabolic pathway
- Rhea: reactions
- PDB structures: RCSB PDB PDBe PDBsum
Search
- PMC: articles
- PubMed: articles
- NCBI: proteins

Cyclohexane-1,2-dione hydrolase (EC 3.7.1.11) is an enzyme characterised from Azoarcus species with systematic name cyclohexane-1,2-dione acylhydrolase (decyclizing). It catalyses the hydrolysis of 1,3-cyclohexanedione to 6-oxohexanoic acid:

1,3-cyclohexanedione
H_{2}O
6-oxohexanoic acid

This enzyme is highly specific for 1,3-cyclohexanedione and requires thiamine pyrophosphate for activity. Its structure has been determined by X-ray crystallography. It has been suggested as a target for molecular engineering.
