= Wheat Improvement Strategic Programme =

The Wheat Improvement Strategic Programme (WISP) is a Biotechnology and Biological Sciences Research Council (BBSRC) funded collaborative programme for wheat improvement, which brings together experts from five UK institutions: John Innes Centre, Rothamsted Research, the National Institute for Agricultural Botany (NIAB) and the University of Nottingham, and the University of Bristol. The programme is divided into four pillars (Landraces, Synthetics, Alien Introgression, Elite Wheats) and two themes (Phenotyping and Genotyping).

== Aims ==
Specific goals of the project are to:

- Understand the genetics behind factors limiting grain yield, such as drought tolerance, plant shape and resistance to pests and diseases.
- Identify new and useful genetic variation from related species and sources of wheat germplasm not adapted to target environments.
- Cross wheat lines to produce germplasm that allows the identification of genes influencing key traits.
- Generate a database of genetic markers, for use in precision breeding.

The new germplasm and the information generated by this project will be made freely available. Plant breeders can use the germplasm to cross with their existing lines, while academics will be able to make use of it to understand the mechanistic basis of key traits in bread wheat. The WISP website gives access to current research outcomes and available resources.
