= 3-hydroxycyclohexanone dehydrogenase =

Class of enzymes

Identifiers
- EC no.: 1.1.99.26
- CAS no.: 123516-44-9

Databases
- IntEnz: IntEnz view
- BRENDA: BRENDA entry
- ExPASy: NiceZyme view
- KEGG: KEGG entry
- MetaCyc: metabolic pathway
- PRIAM: profile
- PDB structures: RCSB PDB PDBe PDBsum
- Gene Ontology: AmiGO / QuickGO
Search
- PMC: articles
- PubMed: articles
- NCBI: proteins

In enzymology, 3-hydroxycyclohexanone dehydrogenase (EC 1.1.99.26) is an enzyme that catalyzes the chemical reaction

3-Hydroxycyclohexanone
+ electron
acceptor
1,3-Cyclohexanedione
+ reduced
acceptor

The two substrates of this enzyme are 3-hydroxycyclohexanone and an electron acceptor. Its products are 1,3-cyclohexanedione and the corresponding reduced acceptor.

This enzyme belongs to the family of oxidoreductases, specifically those acting on the CH-OH group of donor with other acceptors. The systematic name of this enzyme class is 3-hydroxycyclohexanone:acceptor 1-oxidoreductase.
