= C17H25NO5 =

The molecular formula C_{17}H_{25}NO_{5} (molar mass: 323.38 g/mol; exact mass: 323.173274 u) may refer to:

- Alloxydim
- Dibutepinephrine
