= C11H14ClNO2 =

The molecular formula C_{11}H_{14}ClNO_{2} may refer to:

- 6-Chloro-MDMA
- BCPC (herbicide)
