= C10H11ClO3 =

The molecular formula C_{10}H_{11}ClO_{3} (molar mass: 214.64 g/mol, exact mass: 214.0397 u) may refer to:

- 4-(4-Chlorophenoxy)butanoic acid
- Clofibric acid
- Mecoprop (MCPP)
