= George Mason (philanthropist) =

New Zealand philanthropist (1930–2024)

George Mason ONZM
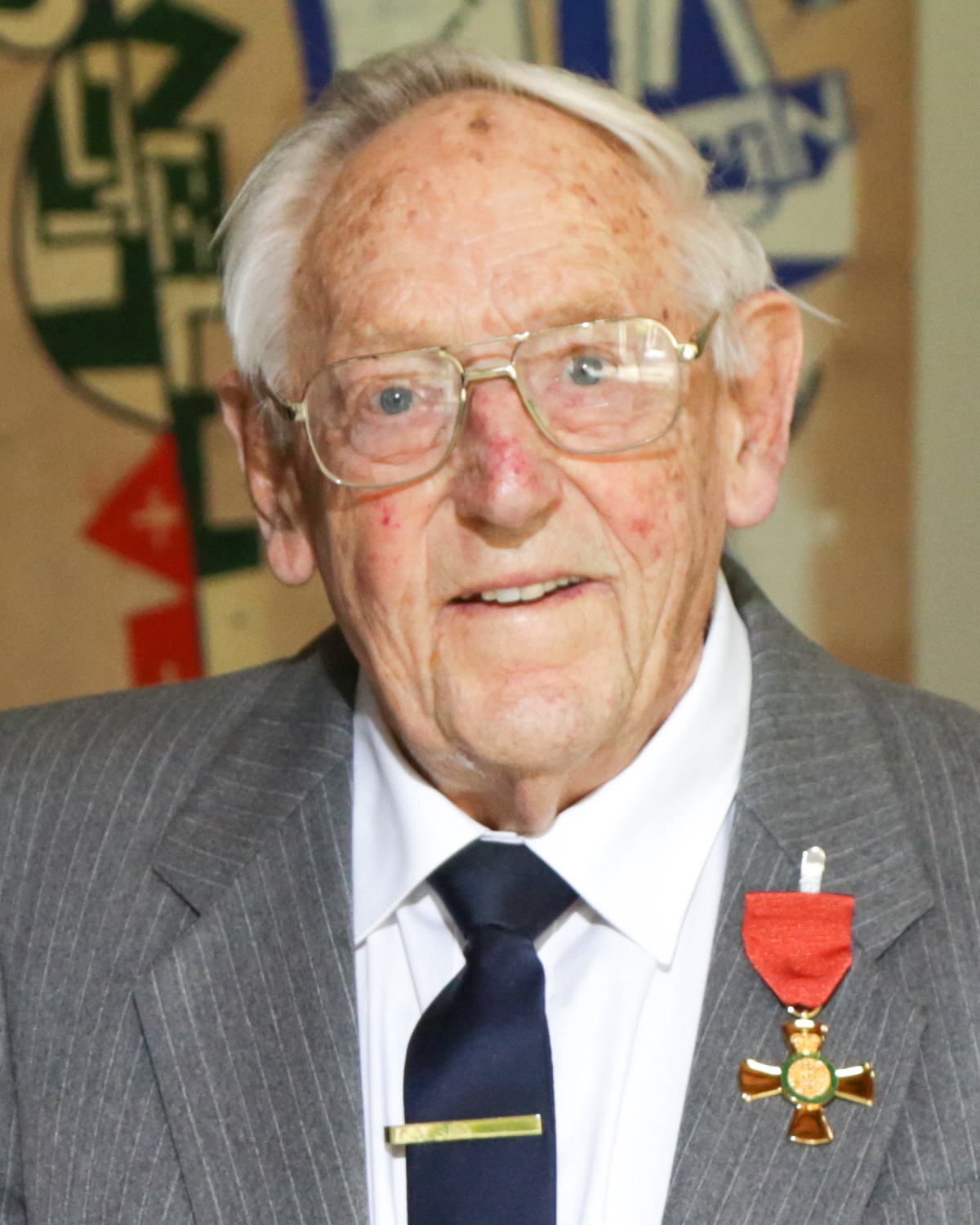
- Mason in 2020
- Born: 2 May 1930; Auckland, New Zealand
- Died: 13 September 2024 (aged 94); Taranaki
- Relatives: Brian Mason (Cousin), Warren Mason (Brother), Dorace Mason (Sister), Barbara Carden (Sister)

Academic background
- Education: University of Auckland; University of California, Davis

George Mason ONZM (2 May 1930 – 13 September 2024) was a New Zealand botanist and philanthropist.

Mason was made an Officer of the New Zealand Order of Merit for his services to conservation, philanthropy, and the community in 2020.

== Early life and education ==
George William Mason was born on 2 May 1930 in the North Shore region of Auckland, New Zealand to George William Mason and Dorace Mason.

Mason completed his Bachelor of Science with majors in Botany and Chemistry at the University of Auckland, beginning in 1948 and graduating in 1952. He went on to pursue a Master of Science in Botany at the university, conducting a seashore study at Ngataringa Bay in North Shore for his thesis and graduated in 1956.

He later earned a PhD in plant physiology from the University of California, Davis, where he taught weed science for three years, leaving in December 1959.

== Career ==
=== Philanthropy ===
In 1995, Mason established the George Mason Charitable Trust.

Mason raised funds for the trust when he sold his share in Zelam to Lonza Group in July 2015.

In 2016, the Trust donated NZ$5,000,000 (US$3,480,622) to the University of Auckland to establish the George Mason Centre for the Natural Environment. The donation was inspired by his cousin Brian Mason's donation to the University of Canterbury.

In 2025, the Trust donated NZ$2,000,000 to establish the George Mason Charitable Trust Endowment Fund administered by the Taranaki Foundation. This fund guarantees the continued distribution of NZ$85,000 annually to 26 designated beneficiaries.

In February 2026, the Trust donated NZ$5,000,000 to the Massey University Foundation to advance natural environmental research at Te Kunenga ki Pūrehuroa Massey University. In the same month it donated another NZ$5,000,000 to the University of Waikato to support multi-disciplinary research into the environment. A third NZ$5,000,000 donation was made to Victoria University to support multidisciplinary research into the natural environment.

In May 2026, the Trust donated a further NZ$10,000,000 to the University of Auckland. The university re-named the Biology Building 106 where Mason studied in the 1950s as the George Mason Biology Building to mark the donation. The gift would ensure "nature-based, solutions-focused environmental research will continue to thrive for generations to come..." the University said.

Mason was invested as an Officer of the New Zealand Order of Merit 'for services to conservation, philanthropy and the community' on 28 July 2020.

== Death and legacy ==
Mason died on 13 September 2024, at the age of 94. A funeral service was held at 12:00 NZST on 21 September 2024 at St Andrew's Church, New Plymouth. This was followed by a committal at the Taranaki Crematorium Chapel.
