= Icafolin-methyl =

Chemical compound

- Skeletal formulae of icafolin-methyl stereoisomers

Names
- Preferred IUPAC name methyl (2R,4R)-4-[[(5S)-3-(3,5-difluorophenyl)-5-ethenyl-4H-1,2-oxazole-5-carbonyl]amino]oxolane-2-carboxylate

Identifiers
CAS Number	2254752-21-9
3D model (JSmol)	Interactive image
ChemSpider	133326948
PubChem CID	146479070
- InChI: InChI=1S/C18H18F2N2O5/c1-3-18(17(24)21-13-7-15(26-9-13)16(23)25-2)8-14(22-27-18)10-4-11(19)6-12(20)5-10/h3-6,13,15H,1,7-9H2,2H3,(H,21,24)/t13?,15?,18-/m1/s1 Key: TVMYHMXZYVGODK-LEHRNKBSSA-N
- SMILES: FC=1C=C(C=C(C1)F)C1=NO[C@@](C1)(C=C)C(=O)N[C@@H]1C[C@@H](OC1)C(=O)OC

Properties
Chemical formula	C_{18}H_{18}F_{2}N_{2}O_{5}
Molar mass	380.348 g·mol^{−1}
- Except where otherwise noted, data are given for materials in their standard state (at 25 °C [77 °F], 100 kPa). Infobox references

Icafolin-methyl is a post-emergent chemical herbicide developed by Bayer. It is a methyl ester derivative of icafolin and has the formula C_{18}H_{18}F_{2}N_{2}O_{5}. The herbicide was patented in 2022, registered in 2025, and is anticipated to be introduced in 2028 for use in Brazil. It is a tubulin inhibitor that may be applied to cereals, oilseeds and soybeans, and is described as being effective against monocotyledonous and dicotyledonous weeds, with examples being sourgrass and barnyardgrass. The herbicide is synthesized as a mixture of (2R,4R) and (2S,4S) stereoisomers through a multi-step process. Icafolin-methyl is hydrolyzed to icafolin in plants.
