= Butroxydim =

Names
- IUPAC name 5-(3-Butanoyl-2,4,6-trimethylphenyl)-2-[1-(ethoxyamino)propylidene]cyclohexane-1,3-dione

Identifiers
CAS Number	138164-12-2
3D model (JSmol)	Interactive image
ChEBI	CHEBI:81901
ChEMBL	ChEMBL1210086
ChemSpider	10469362
ECHA InfoCard	100.101.385
EC Number	414-790-3
KEGG	C18705
PubChem CID	10905426
UNII	LN82LZK7KD
CompTox Dashboard (EPA)	DTXSID0057968
- InChI: InChI=1S/C24H33NO4/c1-7-10-19(26)23-15(5)11-14(4)22(16(23)6)17-12-20(27)24(21(28)13-17)18(8-2)25-29-9-3/h11,17,25H,7-10,12-13H2,1-6H3 Key: LQNKITCRDAZSGT-UHFFFAOYSA-N
- SMILES: CCCC(=O)C1=C(C(=C(C=C1C)C)C2CC(=O)C(=C(CC)NOCC)C(=O)C2)C

Properties
Chemical formula	C_{24}H_{33}NO_{4}
Molar mass	399.531 g·mol^{−1}
Appearance	white solid
Melting point	80 °C (176 °F; 353 K)
- Except where otherwise noted, data are given for materials in their standard state (at 25 °C [77 °F], 100 kPa). Infobox references

Butroxydim is a chemical used as a herbicide. It is a group A herbicide used to kill grass weeds in a range of broadacre crops. Structurally related herbicides against grasses are alloxydim, sethoxydim, clethodim, and cycloxydim.

Butroxydim's HRAC classification is Group A (Australia and global), or Group 1 (numeric). Group A herbicides inhibit acetyl CoA carboxylase, (ACCase).
