= Metamitron =

Herbicide

Names
- Preferred IUPAC name 4-Amino-3-methyl-6-phenyl-1,2,4-triazin-5-one
- Other names: Metamiton; Methiamitron; 4-Amino-3-methyl-6-phenyl-1,2,4-triazin-5(4H)-one; Goltix; Herbrak

Identifiers
CAS Number	41394-05-2
3D model (JSmol)	Interactive image
ChEBI	CHEBI:6791
ChEMBL	ChEMBL3187145
ChemSpider	35563
ECHA InfoCard	100.050.301
EC Number	255-349-3
KEGG	C10930
PubChem CID	38854
RTECS number	XZ3015000
UNII	H69RGO1QO6
CompTox Dashboard (EPA)	DTXSID7047568
- InChI: InChI=1S/C10H10N4O/c1-7-12-13-9(10(15)14(7)11)8-5-3-2-4-6-8/h2-6H,11H2,1H3 Key: VHCNQEUWZYOAEV-UHFFFAOYSA-N
- SMILES: CC1=NN=C(C(=O)N1N)C2=CC=CC=C2

Properties
Chemical formula	C_{10}H_{10}N_{4}O
Molar mass	202.217 g·mol^{−1}
Appearance	Colorless-to-yellow crystals
Density	600 kg/m^{3}
Melting point	167 °C (333 °F; 440 K)
Solubility in water	0.17% (20 °C)
Vapor pressure	0.00000086 Pa (20 °C)
- Except where otherwise noted, data are given for materials in their standard state (at 25 °C [77 °F], 100 kPa). Infobox references

Metamitron is an organic compound used as a pesticide.

It has been widely used in the European Union as a selective herbicide in sugar beets for weed suppression since the mid-1970's.

In 2025, the U.S. EPA registered metamitron as a chemical, plant-growth regulator for thinning fruits for use on apple and pear trees.

== Chemical Structure and Mode of Action ==
Metamitron is a triazinone herbicide. It possesses a triazine ring like other organic compounds that use cyanuric chloride as a precursor. It is a modification of the chemical 1,2,4-triazin-5(4H)-one, with methyl, amino, and phenyl group substitutions at positions 3, 4, and 6.

Metamitron is in the HRAC Mode of action Group 5. It functions as an inhibitor of PSII by binding to serine 264 on the D1 protein. Resistance to metamitron has been found in Chenopodium album growing as weeds among sugar beet fields in Belgium, caused by a mutation in serine 264.

Metamitron is marketed by ADAMA under the trade name Goltix in Europe, the United Kingdom, New Zealand, and South Africa; and as Brevis™ in the United States.

== Health and Environmental Impacts ==
Metamitron is very toxic to aquatic invertebrates, algae and to higher aquatic plants; and has a low expected acute and long-term toxicity-exposure risk for mammals and herbivorous birds. In humans, metamitron has moderate acute oral and inhalation toxicity and is an endocrine disruptor and may be a thyroid toxicant. The major soil degradation product is desamino-metamitron.

== See also ==
- Atrazine
- Hexazinone
- Metribuzin
