= Cyclohexane-1,3-dione hydrolase =

Class of enzymes

Identifiers
- EC no.: 3.7.1.10
- CAS no.: 123516-46-1

Databases
- BRENDA: enzyme data
- ExPASy: NiceZyme view
- KEGG: enzyme entry
- MetaCyc: metabolic pathway
- Rhea: reactions
- PDB structures: RCSB PDB PDBe PDBsum
- Gene Ontology: AmiGO / QuickGO
Search
- PMC: articles
- PubMed: articles
- NCBI: proteins

Cyclohexane-1,3-dione hydrolase (EC 3.7.1.10) is an enzyme characterised from Pseudomonas species that catalyzes the hydrolysis of 1,3-cyclohexanedione to 5-ketohexanoic acid:

1,3-cyclohexanedione
H_{2}O
5-ketohexanoic acid

The enzyme does not use any cofactors, and has been considered for use in synthesis.

This enzyme is a hydrolase, specifically one acting on carbon-carbon bonds in ketonic substances. The systematic name of this enzyme class is cyclohexane-1,3-dione acylhydrolase (decyclizing). This enzyme is also called 1,3-cyclohexanedione hydrolase.
