= Alloxydim =

Chemical compound

- Skeletal formula of alloxydim

Names
- Preferred IUPAC name Methyl 2-hydroxy-6,6-dimethyl-4-oxo-3-[(E)-N-prop-2-enoxy-C-propylcarbonimidoyl]cyclohex-2-ene-1-carboxylate
- Other names: Carbodimedon; Zizalon

Identifiers
| CAS Number | 55634-91-8 |
| 3D model (JSmol) | Interactive image |
| ChEBI | CHEBI:81949 |
| ChEMBL | ChEMBL54789 |
| ChemSpider | 37860 |
| ECHA InfoCard | 100.054.284 |
| EC Number | 259-732-6 |
| PubChem CID | 135571111 |
| UNII | 6MJH7893J2 |
| CompTox Dashboard (EPA) | DTXSID8047210 |
- InChI: InChI=1S/C17H25NO5/c1-6-8-11(18-23-9-7-2)13-12(19)10-17(3,4)14(15(13)20)16(21)22-5/h7,14,19H,2,6,8-10H2,1,3-5H3/b18-11+ Key: ORFLOUYIJLPLPL-WOJGMQOQSA-N
- SMILES: CCC/C(=N\OCC=C)/C1=C(C(C(CC1=O)(C)C)C(=O)OC)O

Properties
| Chemical formula | C_{17}H_{25}NO_{5} |
| Molar mass | 323.389 g·mol^{−1} |

Hazards
- Lethal dose or concentration (LD, LC)
| LD_{50} (median dose) | 2260 mg/kg (rat, oral); >4300 mg/m3/4H (rat, inhalation); >5 g/kg (rat, skin) |
- Except where otherwise noted, data are given for materials in their standard state (at 25 °C [77 °F], 100 kPa). Infobox references

Alloxydim is a chemical compound. Its formula is C_{17}H_{25}NO_{5}. A member of the cyclohexanedione herbicide class, alloxydim is a post-emergence herbicide. The sodium salt is a hygroscopic, water-soluble colorless solid.

Alloxydim's HRAC classification is Group A (Australia and global), or Group 1 (numeric). Group A herbicides inhibit acetyl CoA carboxylase, (ACCase).

== Synthesis ==
Alloxydim may be produced by a multi-step reaction from mesityl oxide with dimethyl malonate, butyryl chloride, and o-ethylhydroxylamine.

== Uses ==
Alloxydim is a grass herbicide that acts by inhibiting acetyl-CoA carboxylase. It was developed by Nippon Soda in 1976 and used from 1978 to 1992 in Germany.

== See also ==
- Butroxydim
- Sethoxydim
- Clethodim
