= Dimedone =

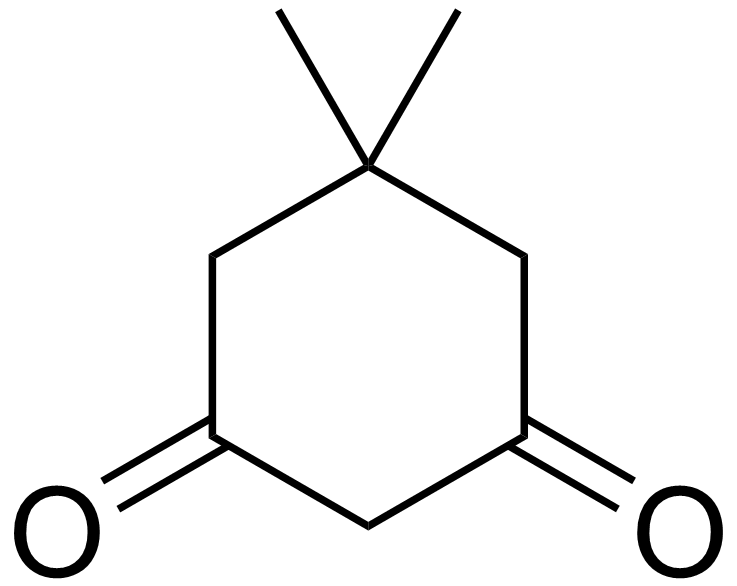

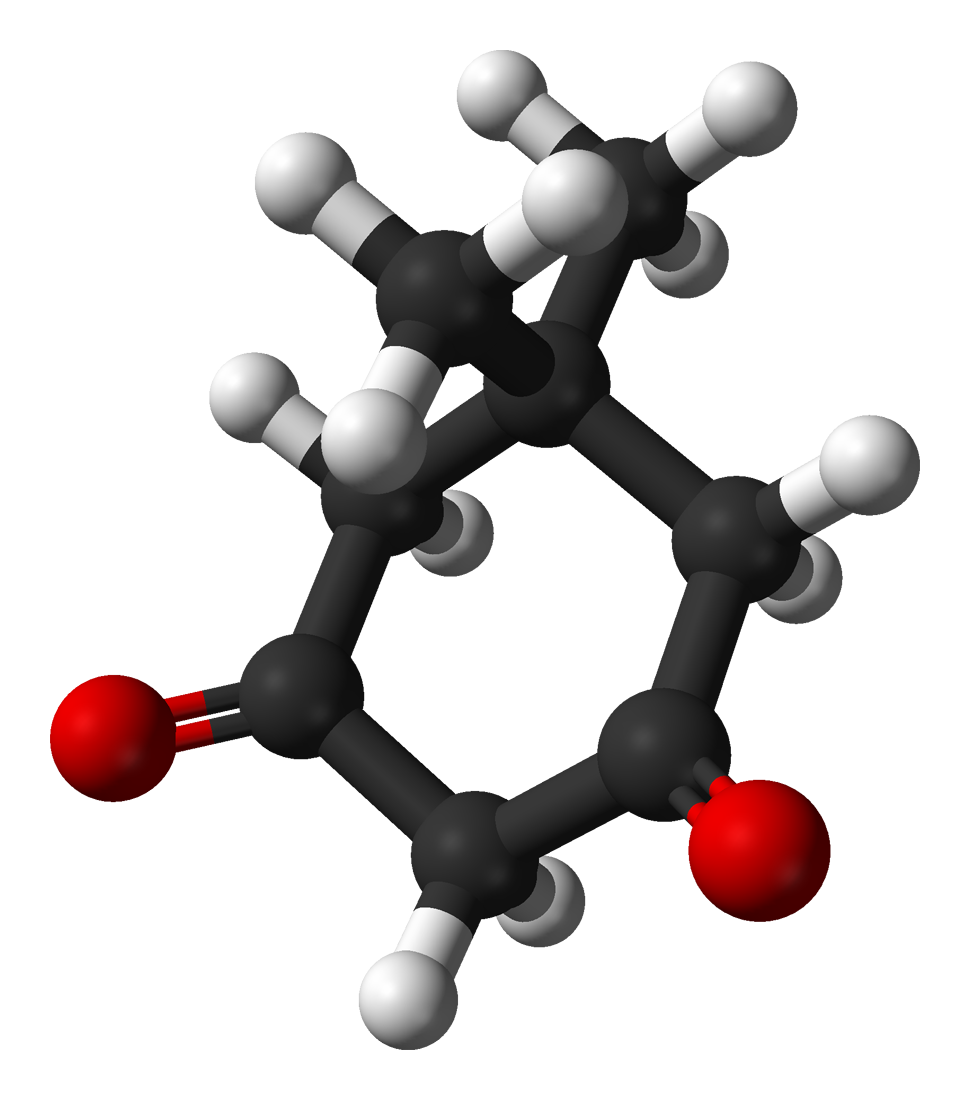

Names
- Preferred IUPAC name 5,5-Dimethylcyclohexane-1,3-dione
- Other names Cyclomethone, 5,5-dimethyl-1,3-cyclohexanedione, Dimethyldihydroresorcinol, Methone

Identifiers
CAS Number	126-81-8
3D model (JSmol)	Interactive image
ChemSpider	29091
ECHA InfoCard	100.004.369
PubChem CID	31358
UNII	B2B5DSX2FC
CompTox Dashboard (EPA)	DTXSID8021987
- InChI: InChI=1S/C8H12O2/c1-8(2)4-6(9)3-7(10)5-8/h3-5H2,1-2H3 Key: BADXJIPKFRBFOT-UHFFFAOYSA-N; InChI=1/C8H12O2/c1-8(2)4-6(9)3-7(10)5-8/h3-5H2,1-2H3 Key: BADXJIPKFRBFOT-UHFFFAOYAX
- SMILES: O=C1CC(=O)CC(C)(C)C1

Properties
Chemical formula	C_{8}H_{12}O_{2}
Molar mass	140.182 g·mol^{−1}
Appearance	White solid
Melting point	147 to 150 °C (297 to 302 °F; 420 to 423 K) (decomposes)
- Except where otherwise noted, data are given for materials in their standard state (at 25 °C [77 °F], 100 kPa). verify (what is ?) Infobox references

Dimedone is an organic compound with the formula (CH_{3})_{2}C(CH_{2})_{2}(CO)_{2}(CH_{2}). Classified as a cyclic diketone, it is a derivative of 1,3-cyclohexanedione. It is a white solid that is soluble in water, as well as ethanol and methanol. It once was used as a reagent to test for the aldehyde functional group. Derivatives of dimedone and 1,3-cyclohexanedione derivatives are used as reagents for selective detection of sulfenic acids in biological samples.

== Synthesis ==
Dimedone is prepared from mesityl oxide and diethyl malonate via a Michael addition reaction.

== Chemical properties ==
=== Tautomerism ===
Dimedone is in equilibrium with its tautomer in solution — in a 2:1 keto to enol ratio in chloroform.

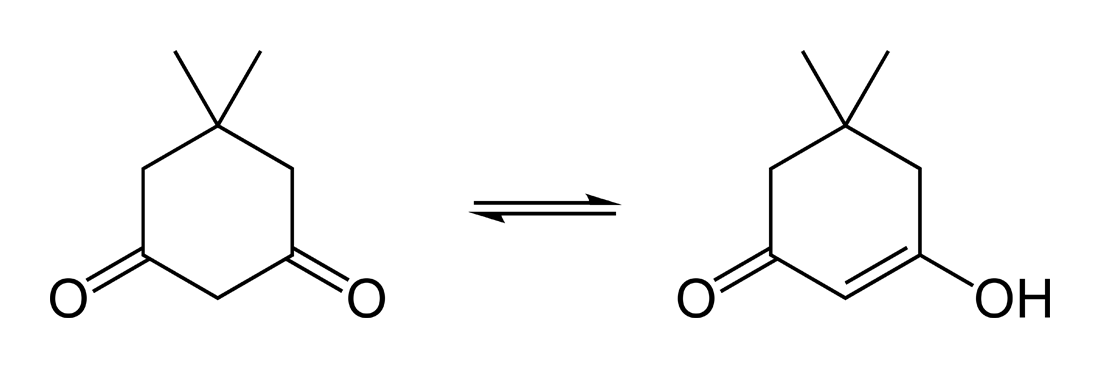

Crystalline dimedone contains chains of molecules, in the enol form, linked by hydrogen bonds:

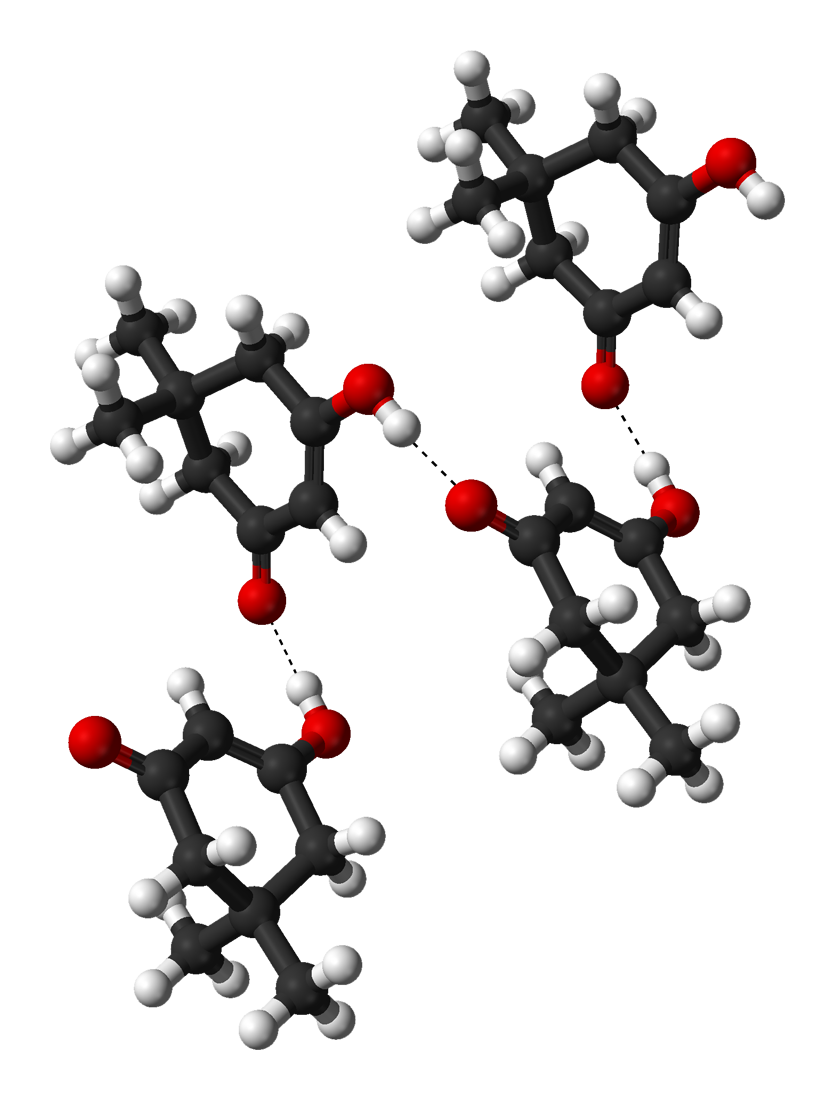

=== Reaction with aldehydes ===
Dimedone reacts with aldehydes to give crystalline derivatives, whose melting points can be used to distinguish between aldehydes.

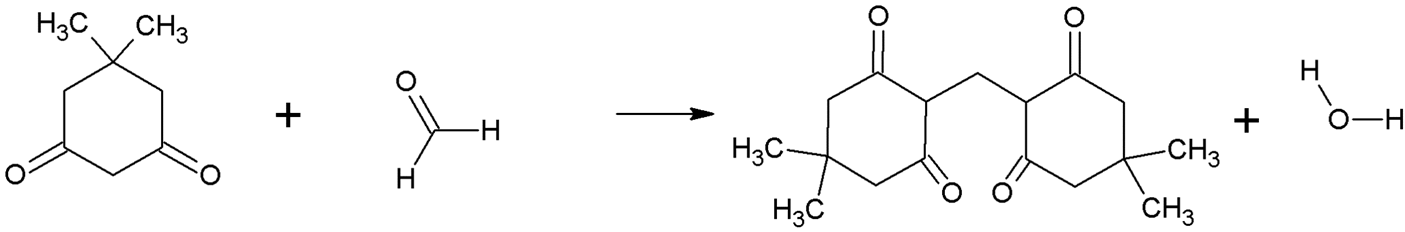
