= Ketospiradox =

Chemical compound

- Skeletal formula of ketospiradox

Names
- Preferred IUPAC name (5',8'-dimethyl-1',1'-dioxospiro[1,3-dioxolane-2,4'-2,3-dihydrothiochromene]-6'-yl)-(2,6-dioxocyclohexylidene)methanolate

Identifiers
CAS Number	209790-31-8
3D model (JSmol)	Interactive image
ChemSpider	57643657
PubChem CID	56841736
- InChI: InChI=1S/C20H22O7S/c1-11-10-13(18(23)16-14(21)4-3-5-15(16)22)12(2)17-19(11)28(24,25)9-6-20(17)26-7-8-27-20/h10,23H,3-9H2,1-2H3/p-1 Key: RXGWQJFJQKQKPH-UHFFFAOYSA-M
- SMILES: CC1=CC(=C(C2=C1S(=O)(=O)CCC23OCCO3)C)C(=C4C(=O)CCCC4=O)[O-]

Properties
Chemical formula	C_{20}H_{21}O_{7}S
Molar mass	405.44 g·mol^{−1}
- Except where otherwise noted, data are given for materials in their standard state (at 25 °C [77 °F], 100 kPa). Infobox references

Ketospiradox is a chemical herbicide. A triketone and aroylcyclohexanedione herbicide, it is a 4-hydroxyphenylpyruvate dioxygenase inhibitor that causes bleaching in broadleaf and grass weeds. Its formula is C_{20}H_{21}O_{7}S.

== Uses ==
Ketospiradox is a synthetic herbicide. It does not have an ISO common name, and was given its current name by the Weed Science Society of America in 2010. The herbicide is applicable to maize, asparagus, and sweetcorn, among other crops, but is not approved for use in the United Kingdom or any European Union member states.
