= 1,3-Cyclohexanedione =

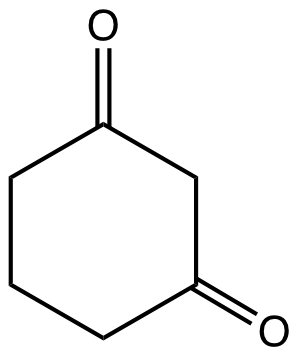

Names
- Preferred IUPAC name Cyclohexane-1,3-dione
- Other names CHD, dihydroresorcinol

Identifiers
CAS Number	504-02-9
3D model (JSmol)	Interactive image
Beilstein Reference	385888
ChEBI	CHEBI:17766
ChEMBL	ChEMBL363919
ChemSpider	10004
ECHA InfoCard	100.007.255
EC Number	207-980-0
Gmelin Reference	200899
KEGG	C01066
PubChem CID	10434
UNII	6UK3D2BXJT
CompTox Dashboard (EPA)	DTXSID1044433
- InChI: InChI=1S/C6H8O2/c7-5-2-1-3-6(8)4-5/h1-4H2 Key: HJSLFCCWAKVHIW-UHFFFAOYSA-N
- SMILES: C1CC(=O)CC(=O)C1

Properties
Chemical formula	C_{6}H_{8}O_{2}
Molar mass	112.128 g·mol^{−1}
Appearance	Colorless or white solid
Density	1.0861 g/cm^{3}
Melting point	105.5 °C (221.9 °F; 378.6 K)
Acidity (pK_{a})	5.20 (H_{2}O)

Hazards
- GHS labelling
Pictograms	(GHS05: Corrosive) (GHS07: Exclamation mark)
Signal word	Danger
Hazard statements	H302, H318, H412
Precautionary statements	P264, P270, P273, P280, P301+P312, P305+P351+P338, P310, P330, P501
- Except where otherwise noted, data are given for materials in their standard state (at 25 °C [77 °F], 100 kPa). Infobox references

1,3-Cyclohexanedione is an organic compound with the formula (CH_{2})_{4}(CO)_{2}. It is one of three isomeric cyclohexanediones. It is a colorless compound that occurs naturally. It is the substrate for cyclohexanedione hydrolase. The compound exists mainly as the enol tautomer.

== Synthesis, structure, and reactivity ==
1,3-Cyclohexanedione is produced by semi-hydrogenation of resorcinol:

C_{6}H_{4}(OH)_{2} + H_{2} → C_{6}H_{8}O_{2}

1,3-Cyclohexanedione exists in solution predominantly as the enol tautomer.

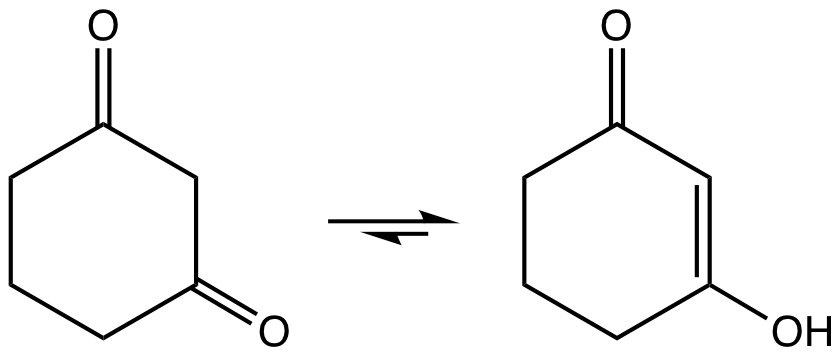
Enolization of 1,3-cyclohexanedione.

It reacts under acid catalysis with alcohols to 3-alkoxyenones. Its pK_{a} is 5.26. Treatment of the sodium salt of the enolate with methyl iodide gives 2-methyl-1,3-cyclohexanedione, which also exists predominantly as the enol.

== Derivatives ==
Dimedone (5,5-dimethyl-1,3-cyclohexanedione) is a well established reagent.

Several herbicides against grasses are formal derivatives of 1,3-cyclohexanedione. Examples of commercial products include cycloxydim, clethodim, tralkoxydim, butroxydim, sethoxydim, profoxydim, and mesotrione.

1,3-Cyclohexanedione is also used in the manufacture of Ondansetron.
