= Flufenauxirim =

Herbicide

- Skeletal formula of flufenauxirim

Names
- Preferred IUPAC name 6-amino-2-[2-fluoro-3-methoxy-4-(trifluoromethyl)phenyl]-5-methoxypyrimidine-4-carboxylic acid
- Other names Flufenauxirime

Identifiers
CAS Number	3054208-46-4
3D model (JSmol)	Interactive image
PubChem CID	172914557
UNII	J83HET9TZJ
- InChI: InChI=1S/C14H11F4N3O4/c1-24-9-6(14(16,17)18)4-3-5(7(9)15)12-20-8(13(22)23)10(25-2)11(19)21-12/h3-4H,1-2H3,(H,22,23)(H2,19,20,21) Key: WNQNYSQIBVZMHA-UHFFFAOYSA-N
- SMILES: COC1=C(C=CC(=C1F)C2=NC(=C(C(=N2)N)OC)C(=O)O)C(F)(F)F

Properties
Chemical formula	C_{14}H_{11}F_{4}N_{3}O_{4}
Molar mass	361.253 g·mol^{−1}
- Except where otherwise noted, data are given for materials in their standard state (at 25 °C [77 °F], 100 kPa). Infobox references

Flufenauxirim is a chemical herbicide. It is a pyrimidinecarboxylic acid and a broad-spectrum herbicide. Its mechanism of action is unclear, but likely involves inhibition of enzymes that are involved in synthesis of fatty acids and amino acids. The formula of flufenauxirim is C_{14}H_{11}F_{4}N_{3}O_{4}.

The herbicide was announced in March 2025 as a product of Chinese company Qingdao KingAgroot Chemical Compound Co., and was provisionally approved by the International Organization for Standardization. It is noted as being effective against grasses and broadleaf weeds. As of August 2025, it is not approved by any European regulatory authority.

== Production and synthesis ==
Flufenauxirim is produced through a substitution reaction between pyrimidine and an aromatic intermediate that is substituted with methoxy and fluorine groups. A derivative of flufenauxirim is flufenauxirim-metotyl.
