= Icafolin =

Chemical compound

- Skeletal formula of cis-icafolin

Names
- Preferred IUPAC name 4-[[3-(3,5-difluorophenyl)-5-ethenyl-4H-1,2-oxazole-5-carbonyl]amino]oxolane-2-carboxylic acid

Identifiers
CAS Number	2254752-27-5
3D model (JSmol)	Interactive image
PubChem CID	146479116
- InChI: InChI=1S/2C17H16F2N2O5/c2*1-2-17(16(24)20-12-6-14(15(22)23)25-8-12)7-13(21-26-17)9-3-10(18)5-11(19)4-9/h2*2-5,12,14H,1,6-8H2,(H,20,24)(H,22,23)/t12-,14-,17+;12-,14-,17-/m01/s1 Key: XTBKUVKZQNKKJP-NHDUPRCSSA-N
- SMILES: C=CC1(CC(=NO1)C2=CC(=CC(=C2)F)F)C(=O)NC3CC(OC3)C(=O)O

Properties
Chemical formula	C_{17}H_{16}F_{2}N_{2}O_{5}
Molar mass	366.321 g·mol^{−1}
- Except where otherwise noted, data are given for materials in their standard state (at 25 °C [77 °F], 100 kPa). Infobox references

Icafolin is a post-emergent chemical herbicide developed by Bayer. Its formula is C_{17}H_{16}F_{2}N_{2}O_{5}. The herbicide was introduced in 2022, registered in 2025, and is anticipated to be introduced in 2028 for use in Brazil. It is a tubulin inhibitor that may be applied to soybeans, corn, and cotton among other crops. The chemical is synthesized as a mixture of (2R,4R) and (2S,4S) stereoisomers through a multi-step process.

Icafolin-methyl, a derivative methyl ester of icafolin, is also a tubulin inhibitor and is hydrolyzed to icafolin in plants.
