= Zuomihuanglong =

Chemical compound

- Skeletal formula of zuomihuanglong

Names
- Preferred IUPAC name Methyl 5-{[(4,6-dimethylpyrimidin-2-yl)carbamoyl]sulfamoyl}-1-(2-pyridyl)-1H-pyrazole-4-carboxylate

Identifiers
CAS Number	104770-29-8
3D model (JSmol)	Interactive image
ChemSpider	160336
PubChem CID	184404
CompTox Dashboard (EPA)	DTXSID00146715
- InChI: InChI=1S/C17H17N7O5S/c1-10-8-11(2)21-16(20-10)22-17(26)23-30(27,28)14-12(15(25)29-3)9-19-24(14)13-6-4-5-7-18-13/h4-9H,1-3H3,(H2,20,21,22,23,26) Key: KABSXJFKDZOTFH-UHFFFAOYSA-N
- SMILES: CC1=CC(=NC(=N1)NC(=O)NS(=O)(=O)C2=C(C=NN2C3=CC=CC=N3)C(=O)OC)C

Properties
Chemical formula	C_{17}H_{17}N_{7}O_{5}S
Molar mass	431.43 g·mol^{−1}
- Except where otherwise noted, data are given for materials in their standard state (at 25 °C [77 °F], 100 kPa). Infobox references

Zuomihuanglong, (Chinese: 唑嘧磺隆) also known as Azosulfuron-methyl, is an herbicide approved for use in China. It is a sulfonylurea compound, and its formula is C_{17}H_{17}N_{7}O_{5}S.

Its mechanism of action is the inhibition of acetolactate synthase and acetohydroxyacid synthase.
