= Pyribenzoxim =

Names
- Preferred IUPAC name {2,6-Bis[(4,6-dimethoxypyrimidin-2-yl)oxy]phenyl}{[(diphenylmethylidene)amino]oxy}methanone
- Other names LGC-40863, Pyanchor

Identifiers
CAS Number	168088-61-7
3D model (JSmol)	Interactive image
ChemSpider	155056
ECHA InfoCard	100.129.381
EC Number	605-503-4
PubChem CID	178117
UNII	VBD478968P
CompTox Dashboard (EPA)	DTXSID2057996
- InChI: InChI=1S/C32H27N5O8/c1-39-24-18-25(40-2)34-31(33-24)43-22-16-11-17-23(44-32-35-26(41-3)19-27(36-32)42-4)28(22)30(38)45-37-29(20-12-7-5-8-13-20)21-14-9-6-10-15-21/h5-19H,1-4H3 Key: OVXMBIVWNJDDSM-UHFFFAOYSA-N
- SMILES: COc1cc(nc(n1)Oc2cccc(c2C(=O)ON=C(c3ccccc3)c4ccccc4)Oc5nc(cc(n5)OC)OC)OC

Properties
Chemical formula	C_{32}H_{27}N_{5}O_{8}
Molar mass	609.595 g·mol^{−1}
- Except where otherwise noted, data are given for materials in their standard state (at 25 °C [77 °F], 100 kPa). Infobox references

Pyribenzoxim, also known as LGC-40863, is a synthetic herbicide.

Pyribenzoxim's HRAC classification is Group B (global, Aus), Group 2 (numeric), as it is an acetohydroxyacid synthase inhibitor.
