= Chlorthiamide =

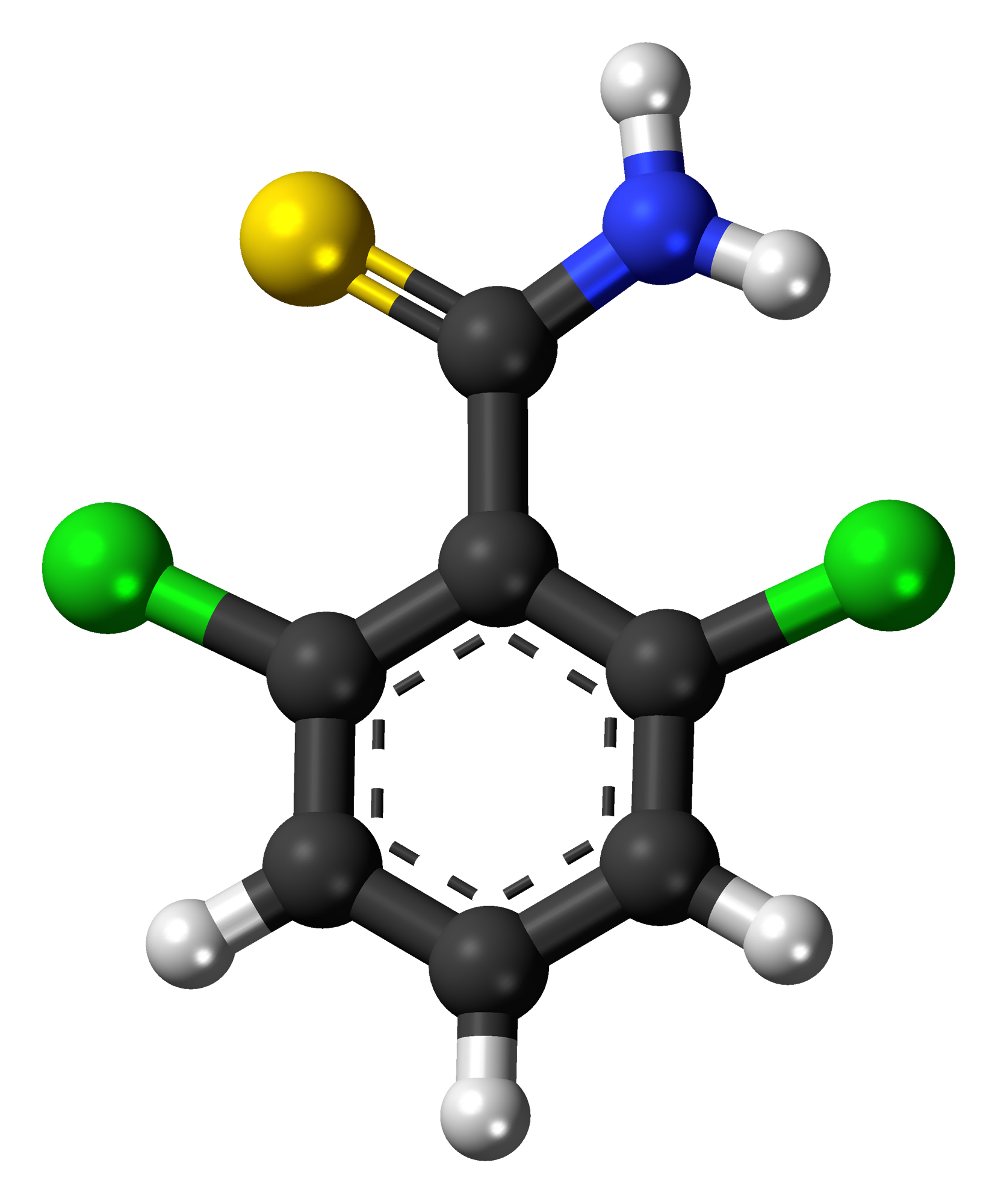

Names
- Preferred IUPAC name 2,6-Dichlorobenzene-1-carbothioamide
- Other names 2,6-Dichlorobenzothioamide

Identifiers
CAS Number	1918-13-4
3D model (JSmol)	Interactive image
ChEBI	CHEBI:949
ChEMBL	ChEMBL3188781
ChemSpider	2016563
ECHA InfoCard	100.016.035
EC Number	217-637-7
KEGG	C11041
PubChem CID	2734819
RTECS number	CV3850000
UNII	5JVN5HGD7S
CompTox Dashboard (EPA)	DTXSID4041783
- InChI: InChI=1/C7H5Cl2NS/c8-4-2-1-3-5(9)6(4)7(10)11/h1-3H,(H2,10,11) Key: KGKGSIUWJCAFPX-UHFFFAOYAZ
- SMILES: S=C(c1c(Cl)cccc1Cl)N

Properties
Chemical formula	C_{7}H_{5}Cl_{2}NS
Molar mass	206.092 g mol^{−1}
Density	1.473 g/cm^{3}
Melting point	151-152°C
Solubility in water	0.095 g/l

Hazards
- GHS labelling
Pictograms	(GHS07: Exclamation mark)
Signal word	Warning
Hazard statements	H302
Precautionary statements	P264, P270, P301+P312, P330, P501
Flash point	147.7 °C (297.9 °F; 420.8 K)
- Except where otherwise noted, data are given for materials in their standard state (at 25 °C [77 °F], 100 kPa). Infobox references

Chlorthiamide is an organic compound with the chemical formula C_{7}H_{5}Cl_{2}NS used as an herbicide.

== Links ==
- Chlorthiamide in the Pesticide Properties DataBase (PPDB)
