= National Institute of Agricultural Botany =

UK plant science research company

- Entrance to site in Heydon, Cambridgeshire
- Type: Agribusiness
- Industry: Agriculture
- Founded: 1919
- Headquarters: Cambridge, England
- Products: Trials and valuation; Seed certification; Plant breeders rights; Laboratory services; Research and training courses; Seed testing; Subscription services; Publications
- Number of employees: Approx. 150
- Website: www.niab.com

The National Institute of Agricultural Botany (NIAB) is a plant science research company based in Cambridge, UK.

== NIAB group ==
The NIAB group consists of:

- NIAB
- NIAB EMR – a horticultural and agricultural research institute at East Malling, Kent, with a specialism in fruit and clonally propagated crop production. Joined the NIAB Group in 2016.
- NIAB CUF – a potato agronomy unit. Joined the NIAB Group in 2013.
- NIAB TAG – the arable group that joined in 2009
- BCPC – promotes the use of science and technology in the understanding and application of effective, sustainable crop production. Acquired by NIAB in 2018.

== History ==
Original building on Huntingdon Road, Cambridge

NIAB was founded in 1919 by Sir Lawrence Weaver. The original Huntingdon Road headquarters building was opened in 1921, by King George V and Queen Mary.

== Regional centres ==
NIAB operates 10 regional centres throughout England:

- Cambridge
- Morley (Norfolk)
- East Malling (Kent)
- Sutton Scotney (Hampshire)
- Newton Abbot and Plumber Farm (Devon)
- Callow (Herefordshire)
- Telford (Shropshire),
- Benniworth and Kirton (Lincolnshire)
- Headley Hall (Tadcaster, Yorkshire)
- Dorset (South West)
- Cirencester (Gloucestershire)
