= Pyraquinate =

Chemical compound

- Skeletal formula of pyraquinate

Names
- Preferred IUPAC name [4-[3-(3-chlorophenyl)-1,5-dimethyl-2,4-dioxoquinazoline-6-carbonyl]-2,5-dimethylpyrazol-3-yl] N,N-diethylcarbamate

Identifiers
CAS Number	2378093-62-8
3D model (JSmol)	Interactive image
ChEBI	CHEBI:229757
ChemSpider	115266409
PubChem CID	146187940
UNII	PS6H4WV7W2
- InChI: InChI=1S/C27H28ClN5O5/c1-7-32(8-2)27(37)38-25-22(16(4)29-31(25)6)23(34)19-12-13-20-21(15(19)3)24(35)33(26(36)30(20)5)18-11-9-10-17(28)14-18/h9-14H,7-8H2,1-6H3 Key: QCETYWAAOPFNSO-UHFFFAOYSA-N
- SMILES: CCN(CC)C(=O)OC1=C(C(=NN1C)C)C(=O)C2=C(C3=C(C=C2)N(C(=O)N(C3=O)C4=CC(=CC=C4)Cl)C)C
- Except where otherwise noted, data are given for materials in their standard state (at 25 °C [77 °F], 100 kPa). Infobox references

Pyraquinate is a chemical herbicide. It is a benzoylpyrazole, having a central functional group that includes a benzoyl group combined with pyrazole, and is in the class of 4-hydroxyphenylpyruvate dioxygenase inhibiting herbicides. Its formula is C_{27}H_{28}ClN_{5}O_{5}.

The herbicide was patented in 2022, but only released to market in 2025. It is not approved for use in any European Union countries. Under HRAC classification, it is placed in class F2.

Several crystalline forms of pyraquinate are known. The commercially available form, as well as several of its polymorphs, has a triclinic crystal system.

== Uses ==
Pyraquinate was developed for use in the treatment of rice-growing paddy fields to reduce the incidence of moleplant. The product, manufactured by Shandong Cynda Chemical Co., Ltd., was approved for use in China on September 17, 2024. Other plants that pyraquinate is effective against are Leptochloa panicea, various Echinochloa species, Eragrostis japonica, Lecrsia oryzoides, and Paspalum distichum.
