= Isoxafenacil =

Chemical compound

- Skeletal formula of isoxafenacil

Names
- Preferred IUPAC name ethyl 3-{2-chloro-4-fluoro-5-[3-methyl-2,6-dioxo-4-(trifluoromethyl)pyrimidin-1-yl]phenyl}-5-methyl-4H-1,2-oxazole-5-carboxylate

Identifiers
CAS Number	1949837-17-5
3D model (JSmol)	Interactive image
PubChem CID	146323887
UNII	XDW5XZ5MRP
- InChI: InChI=1S/C19H16ClF4N3O5/c1-4-31-16(29)18(2)8-12(25-32-18)9-5-13(11(21)6-10(9)20)27-15(28)7-14(19(22,23)24)26(3)17(27)30/h5-7H,4,8H2,1-3H3 Key: ZFQQLFKHTMIGJX-UHFFFAOYSA-N
- SMILES: CCOC(=O)C1(C)CC(c2cc(-n3c(=O)cc(C(F)(F)F)n(C)c3=O)c(F)cc2Cl)=NO1

Properties
Chemical formula	C_{19}H_{16}ClF_{4}N_{3}O_{5}
Molar mass	477.80 g·mol^{−1}
- Except where otherwise noted, data are given for materials in their standard state (at 25 °C [77 °F], 100 kPa). Infobox references

Isoxafenacil is an herbicide belonging to the N-phenylimide class of chemicals. Its mechanism of action is the inhibition of protoporphyrinogen oxidase, corresponding to the HRAC group Group G (Australia), Group E (global) or Group 14 (numeric).

The herbicide was first approved to use the ISO common name isoxafenacil in May 2025, and is included in the March 2026 update of the ISO 1750:2023 dataset. It is produced by Nantong Jiangshan Agrochemical and Chemicals Co. Ltd. under the Chinese common name 苯嘧草唑; běnmìcǎozuò.
