= Chloramben =

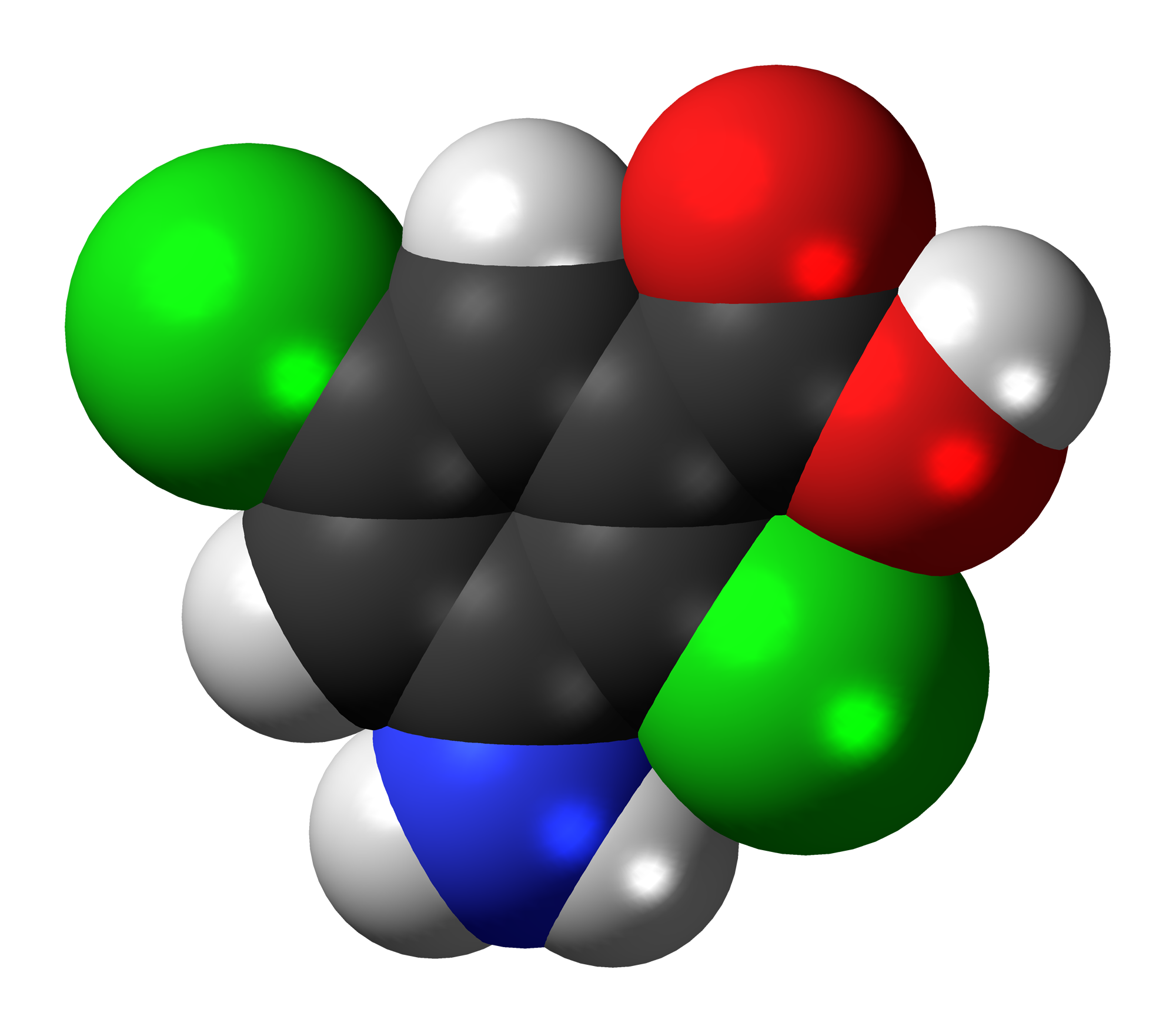

Names
- IUPAC name 3-Amino-2,5-dichlorobenzoic acid
- Other names Ambiben, Amiben

Identifiers
CAS Number	133-90-4
3D model (JSmol)	Interactive image
ChEBI	CHEBI:82183
ChEMBL	ChEMBL446021
ChemSpider	8309
ECHA InfoCard	100.004.658
EC Number	205-123-5
KEGG	C19056
PubChem CID	8630
UNII	EWG424FFB5
UN number	3077
CompTox Dashboard (EPA)	DTXSID2020262
- InChI: InChI=1S/C7H5Cl2NO2/c8-3-1-4(7(11)12)6(9)5(10)2-3/h1-2H,10H2,(H,11,12) Key: HSSBORCLYSCBJR-UHFFFAOYSA-N; InChI=1/C7H5Cl2NO2/c8-3-1-4(7(11)12)6(9)5(10)2-3/h1-2H,10H2,(H,11,12) Key: HSSBORCLYSCBJR-UHFFFAOYAE
- SMILES: C1=C(C=C(C(=C1N)Cl)C(=O)O)Cl

Properties
Chemical formula	C_{7}H_{5}Cl_{2}NO_{2}
Molar mass	206.02 g·mol^{−1}
Appearance	Colorless crystalline solid
Melting point	194 to 197 °C (381 to 387 °F; 467 to 470 K) (decomposes); 200-201 °C
Solubility in water	700 mg/L

Hazards
- GHS labelling
Pictograms	(GHS07: Exclamation mark) (GHS08: Health hazard)
Signal word	Danger
Hazard statements	H315, H319, H335, H350
Precautionary statements	P201, P202, P261, P264, P271, P280, P281, P302+P352, P304+P340, P305+P351+P338, P308+P313, P312, P321, P332+P313, P337+P313, P362, P403+P233, P405, P501
- Lethal dose or concentration (LD, LC)
LD_{50} (median dose)	3500 mg/kg (rat); 3725 mg/kg (mouse)
- Except where otherwise noted, data are given for materials in their standard state (at 25 °C [77 °F], 100 kPa). verify (what is ?) Infobox references

Chloramben is a selective herbicide used to control the seedlings of broadleaf weeds and annual grasses. It is mostly used for soybeans, but also for dry beans, peanuts, sunflowers, peppers, cotton, sweet potatoes, squash, hardwood trees, shrubs, and some conifers.

Chloramben is considered practically nontoxic.
