= Ametryn =

Weed control herbicide

Names
- IUPAC name N^{2}-ethyl-N^{4}-isopropyl-6-methylthio-1,3,5-triazine-2,4-diamine
- Preferred IUPAC name N^{2}-ethyl-6-(methylsulfanyl)-N^{4}-(propan-2-yl)-1,3,5-triazine-2,4-diamine
- Other names N-ethyl-N′-(1-methylethyl)-6-(methylthio)-1,3,5-triazine-2,4-diamine

Identifiers
CAS Number	834-12-8
3D model (JSmol)	Interactive image
ChEBI	CHEBI:22472
ChEMBL	ChEMBL1235774
ChemSpider	12705
ECHA InfoCard	100.011.486
EC Number	212-634-7
KEGG	C18700
PubChem CID	13263
UNII	1SPQ95183Y
UN number	2763 (AMETRYN)
CompTox Dashboard (EPA)	DTXSID1023869
- InChI: InChI=1S/C9H17N5S/c1-5-10-7-12-8(11-6(2)3)14-9(13-7)15-4/h6H,5H2,1-4H3,(H2,10,11,12,13,14) Key: RQVYBGPQFYCBGX-UHFFFAOYSA-N
- SMILES: CCNC1=NC(=NC(=N1)SC)NC(C)C

Properties
Chemical formula	C_{9}H_{17}N_{5}S
Molar mass	227.33 g·mol^{−1}
Appearance	White powder
Density	1180 kg/cu.m
Melting point	86.7 °C (188.1 °F; 359.8 K)
Boiling point	337 °C (639 °F; 610 K)
Solubility in water	0.2 g/L
Solubility in acetone	56.9 g/L
Solubility in toluene	4.6 g/L
Vapor pressure	0.365 mPa

Hazards
- GHS labelling
Pictograms	(GHS07: Exclamation mark) (GHS09: Environmental hazard)
Signal word	Warning
Hazard statements	H302, H410
Precautionary statements	P264, P270, P273, P301+P317, P330, P391, P501

Related compounds
Related compounds	dimethametryn, prometryn, simetryn, terbutryn
- Except where otherwise noted, data are given for materials in their standard state (at 25 °C [77 °F], 100 kPa). Infobox references

Ametryn (also known as ametryne) is a selective, systemic herbicide, used in Australia preemergently and postemergently to control annual grasses and broadleaf weeds in crops and roadways, drains, railways and footpaths. It is a triazine and methylthiotriazine. It is also used in South Africa.

== Mechanism ==
Ametryn is absorbed through roots and leaves, then translocates up from the base of the plant in xylem and accumulates in the apical meristems.

Ametryn works by inhibiting electron transport in the photosystem II complex. Such herbicides bind to plastoquinone B binding site on the D1 protein, stopping electron transport for synthesising adenosine triphosphate, which is used in cell metabolism, and nicotinamide adenine dinucleotide phosphate, which converts carbon dioxide to glucose, hence halting carbon dioxide capture.

As an auxiliary mechanism, photosystem II disrupting herbicides increase the levels of reactive oxygen species, which react and bind to cellular nonsense including DNA and RNA. Some amount forms naturally, but phototrophs form more when the incoming light exceeds the capacity to make carbon dioxide to other molecules. Lengthy stays of reactive oxygen species in the weed cause cell harm and sometimes death.

== Regulations ==
Ametryn is used in Australia, professionally and sold as a liquid concentrate or water dipersible granule, and applied with ground boom, aerial or handheld methods.

It is not approved for use in the European Union, New Zealand nor the United Kingdom, but is used in South Africa.

== Safety ==
Ametryn's acute toxicity is low, both if eaten or on skin. It might be a skin sensitiser. The effects of acute exposure are shortness of breath, ruffled fur, diarrhoea, lethargy and poor posture in guinea pigs. If exposed to ametryn, it is rapidly excreted. 89% is gone within 7 days.

Short term effects were tested by putting ametryn in rat's food for 3 weeks. It was found the rats ate less food. Rabbits, with skin-applied ametryn, also ate less and lost small amounts of weight. The doses tested went up to 1000 mg/kg/day. Long term effcts, tested on rats and dogs over 1 to 2 years, showed anaemia and liver damage at 2.2 mg/kg/day, and harm to several organs at doses over 8 mg/kg/day.

Ametryn does not cause cancer, is not genotoxic and has no particular effect on reproduction or foetal development. No evidence was found for these maladies in animal testing.

== Application ==
Ametryne should be incorporated into soil within 10 days of application. It has been sold formulated as 800 g/L water-dispersible granule concentrate, to be applied as a directed spray. Typical spray volumes are 300-400 L of water per hectare, containing 2.3 kg/Ha of ametryne. It is also sold as a 500 g/L suspension concentrate containing ethylene glycol.

== Environmental behaviour ==
Ametryn's half life in soil, is about 62 days, which is moderately persistent. In water, the halflife is over a week. Degradation is not expected by hydrolysis, as ametryn lacks appropriate functional groups; volatilisation is also unlikely. Some microbial degradation is expected, but probably, most ametryn will bind to dirt and suspended particles. Ametryn has a low capacity for soil adsorption, and moderate solubility, so one might expect it to leach into groundwater, however, it does not. A 1987 USEPA study detected ametryn in only 1 in 500 surface water samples, even though it was found in 1 in 25 groundwater samples. Ametryn is relatively mobile, and is only expected in water after rain or flooding washes it into waterbodies. From 2011 to 2015, ametryn was detectable in about 1 in 6 monitored Queensland catchments.

=== Drinking water ===
Australia put a guideline of 0.07 mg/L (70 μg/L), based on a human NOEL of 2 mg/kg/day and a safety factor of 10. The highest detected concentration in source water, 0.3 mg/L, was in the sugar cane areas of Queensland. Elevated concentrations have also been reported from Brazil's sugar cane area. Drinking water can be treated with chlorination, which removes ametryn completely. Also somewhat successful are ozonation and activated carbon adsorption. Conventional coagulation/flocculation is unreliable on its own, but using some activated carbon, removes ametryn completely.

The Australian Acceptable Daily Intake (ADI) is 0.02 mg/kg/day, (previously 0.05 mg/kg/day), based on the same NOEL, and a safety factor of 100. The main source of exposure is expected to be food residues, not water runoff, though the report notes that ametryn food residue from properly-operated farms is "generally low".

=== Aquatic toxicity ===
Ametryn can kill fish. Over 96 hour tests, there was a NOEL (for mortality) of 0.7 mg/L for rainbow trout, and an LC50 for fathead minnow of 16 mg/L. A NOEL (immobilisation) for daphnia magna of 0.24 mg/L over 96 hours was seen, but it took 73 mg/L to immobilise half the daphnia over 24 hours.

=== Aquatic toxicity to algae ===
For Stauroneis amphoroides, a type of diatom algae, 0.026 mg/L of ametryn is expected to kill 50% over 72 hours of exposure. (EC_{50}) Green algae's EC50s ranged from a 96-hour 0.0003 mg/L (Chlorella pyrenoidosa) to a 240-hour 10 mg/L (Chlorococcum). Macrophyte toxicities came from 96 hour EC_{10} of 1.09 μg/L (lesser duckweed) to a 168-hour NOEL of 2 μg/L and EC_{50} of 13 μg/L (fat duckweed). Heterotrophic species had toxicity values from 240 μg/L to 73,000 μg/L to ametryne.

Ametryn is more toxic to phototrophic species than heterotrophic. Light levels affect the toxicity, as more light more easily produces reactive oxygen species when photosystem II is inhibited. The Australian government recommends a default guideline value (DGV) of <0.1 μg/L in natural waters, for 95% species protection.

== Tradenames ==
In Australia, ametryn is sold as "Ametryn" or "Ametrex".
