= Weed science =

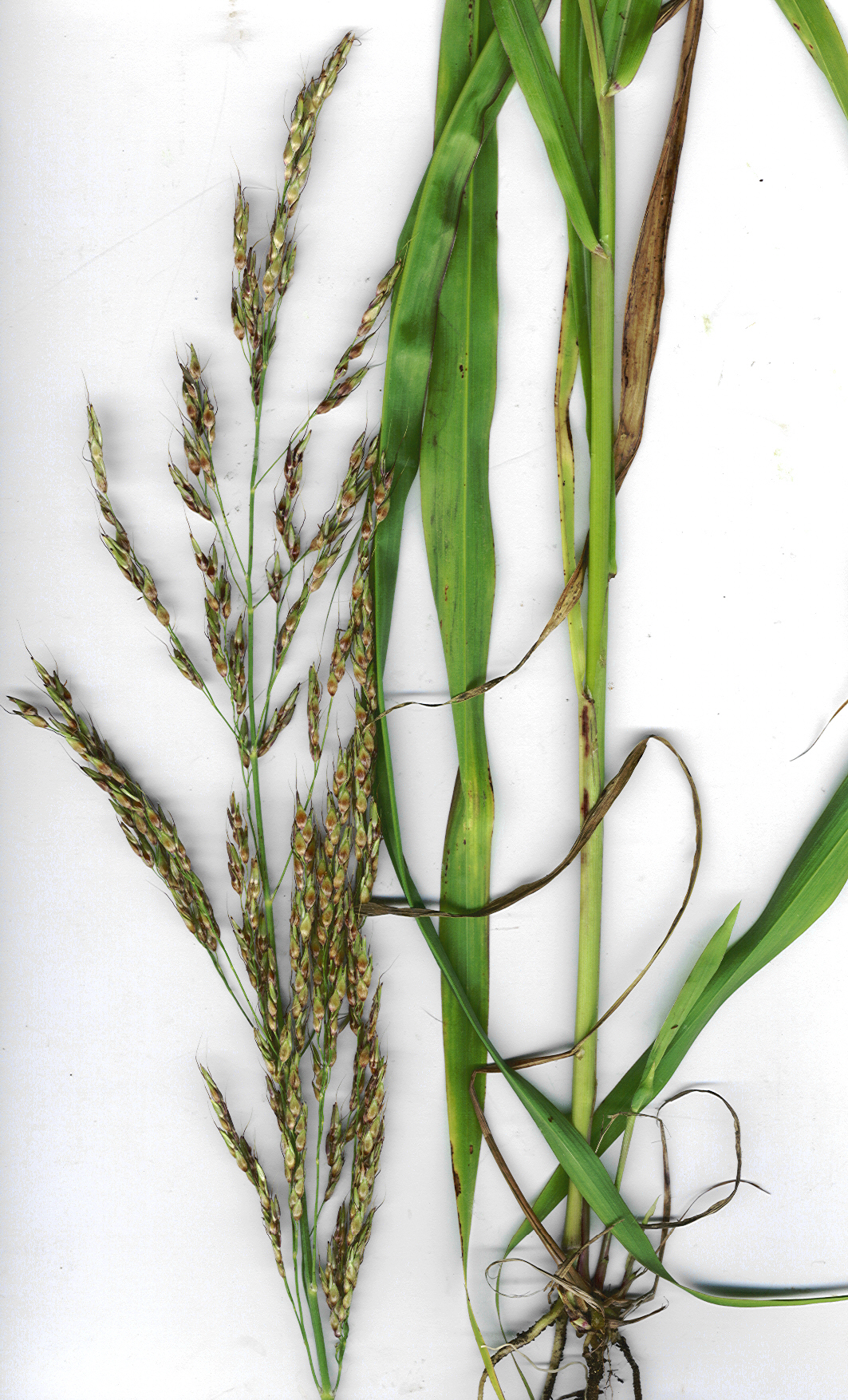
Johnson grass considered a weed

Weed science is a scientific discipline concerned with plants that may be considered weeds, their effects on human activities, and their management "a branch of applied ecology that attempts to modify the environment against natural evolutionary trends.".

== History ==
Weeds have existed since humans began settled agriculture have existed since the advent of settled agriculture around 10,000 years ago it has been suggested that the most common characteristic of the ancestors of our presently dominant crop plants is their willingness—their tendency to be successful, to thrive, in disturbed habitats, mostly those around human dwellings. Farmers have likely always been aware of weeds in their crops, although the evidence for their awareness and concern is nearly all anecdotal.

Unlike other agricultural sciences like entomology or plant pathology, the emergence of weed science is comparatively recent, occurring largely within the 20th century and coinciding with the development of herbicides.

Weeds are controlled in much of the world by hand (roguing) or with crude hoes. The size of a farmer's holding and yield per unit area are limited by several things and paramount among them is the rapidity with which a family can weed its crops. More human labor may be expended to weed crops than on any other single human enterprise, and most of that labor is expended by women. Weed control in the Western world and other developed areas of the world is done by sophisticated machines and by substituting chemical energy (herbicides) for mechanical and human energy. There is a relationship between the way farmers control weeds and the ability of a nation to feed its people. Successful weed management is one of the essential ingredients to maintain and increase food production.

In 1923, Clark and Fletcher suggested that the "annual losses due to the occurrence of pernicious weeds on farm land in Canada, although acknowledged in a general way, are far greater than is realized." They thought this was because "farmers gave little critical attention to the weeds growing among their crops." They did not deny that farmers were aware of the weeds only that they could do little about them. Many of the same weeds described by Clark and Fletcher are shown in most current weed identification books. In spite of continued research to mitigate weeds annually many of the same species continue to be problematic. The first U.S. Congressional appropriation for weed control was made in 1901 for work on control of johnsongrass, 23 years after Congress had appropriated funds for work on cotton insect pests. Petroleum-based herbicides were first used on California crop land in 1924 and soon became widely accepted in Southwestern states. In 1942, oils were used extensively for weed control in carrots and subsequently were used in forest nurseries. French scientists sprayed apple trees with dinitro dyes to control mosses, algae, and lichens. Some noticed that grasses that were wet from the spray did not die and that observation, or, more likely, a series of observations, led to the use of dinitros as herbicides for selective control of broadleaved weeds in cereals and flax. Sinox (sodium dinitro cresylate) was developed by Pastac in 1933. It was the first selective organic herbicide introduced in the US. From the early 1930s until about 1945, it was used extensively in grains, clover hay, grass seed crops, peas, cane berries, onions, and lawns.

Timmons, writing in 1970 reported that "available literature indicates that relatively few agricultural leaders and farmers became interested in weeds as a problem before 1200 A.D. or even before 1500 A.D." The “critical attention” Clark and Fletcher thought was absent increased slowly, primarily because the general attitude seemed to be that “weeds were a curse which must be endured, and about which little could be done except by methods which were incidental to crop production, and by laborious supplemental hand methods."

Jethro Tull, in 1731, appealed for greater attention to weeds:

It is needless to go about to compute the value of the damage weeds do, since all experienced husbandmen know it to be very great, and would unanimously agree to extirpate their whole race as entirely as in England they have done the wolves, though much more innocent and less rapacious than weeds.

Farmers however were bound by their inability to do much about weeds except by laborious hand methods.

Insects cause both human health and crop problems. Weeds, with a few exceptions, do not cause direct harm to humans. Those that do such as poison ivy and poison oak can be avoided. Poisonous weeds have never been widespread as a weed of crops nor of great concern to the majority of people. Many weeds aggravated human allergies but many did not and other common plants are also allergenic. Insects and insecticides were respectively causes of and solutions to human disease problems. Weeds and herbicides were not and less attention was paid to them. Weeds and herbicides were agricultural problems. They were not of general societal concern. There were a few scientists interested in the study of weeds and in developing techniques to reduce the crop losses caused by weeds. There were only three full-time weed experts in 1934 and only a few part-time ones.

By late 1951, 46 state agricultural experiment stations had active weed research programs and most of them were working on weed control with herbicides. Now all colleges of agriculture in land-grant universities have weed scientists and a well-developed weed management program.

Weed science has been strongly influenced by herbicides and mechanical technology developed by supporting industries, by research by weed scientists, and, ultimately, used by farmers. Herbicides greatly expanded the opportunities and range of methods for vegetation management and weed control. The definition accepted by the Weed Science Society of America (WSSA) is “A chemical substance or cultured biological organism used to kill or suppress the growth of plants.”

Weed scientists have tended to focus on results and progress. Modern agriculture in the world's developed nations has addressed but not eliminated most weed problems through extensive use of herbicides and the more recent development of herbicide resistant crops through genetic modification. These methods while undeniably successful for their intended purpose also have created environmental, non-target species, and human health problems. Farmers in the world's developing nations use some herbicides but newer herbicides and the necessary application technology are often unavailable or too expensive. Weeds are always present in these farmer's fields but often the most available, affordable control methods are mechanical weeding, usually with animal power, or by hand, and most of the labor is provided by women. Neither the hypothesis that more energy is expended for the weeding man's crops than for any other single human task nor the corollary hypothesis that women do most of the world's weeding has been verified, but they are widely accepted.

Weed science no longer focuses exclusively on agriculture, with applications in industrial activities like maintaining railroad rights-of-way, controlling invasive species (including aquatic weeds) in natural areas and sports/park/home lawn care

== Objectives of Weed Science ==
=== Management of particularly troublesome weeds ===
While any plant can be a weed, approximately 250 plant species are sufficiently troublesome, cosmopolitan and economically injurious to warrant targeted research into their biology to assist in their management and control. Examples of some of these troublesome weed species in North America are Palmer amaranth (Amaranthus palmeri S. Watson), common lambsquarter (Chenopodium album L.), horseweed (Erigeron canadensis L.), morningglory (Ipomoea spp.), waterhemp (Amaranthus tuberculatus (Moq.) J. D. Sauer) and common ragweed (Ambrosia artemisiifolia L.). Some weed science researchers provide extension resources for farmers and land managers by trialing a variety of weed control tools and tactics on a specific weed, publishing the results and providing recommendations for their future management. Other researchers may study the biology of weed seeds in order to determine how long weed seeds can remain viable in a soil. Much of this research is conducted at public land-grant universities.

=== Herbicide application and interaction ===
Another aspect of weed science research is concerned with generating knowledge about the active ingredients of herbicides. Specifically, evaluating the response of weeds and crops to different combinations of herbicides at varying rates, droplet sizes, and environmental conditions within different cropping systems containing different weed communities. Some herbicides become more effective when mixed together (syngerism), while other herbicide combinations reduce the overall control (antagonism). Some weed science researchers trial a variety of herbicides applications and combinations on weeds to evaluate their impact on the weeds and crops. Most of this research is conducted by private companies.

=== Herbicide fate and action ===
Another aspect of weed science is concerned with how herbicides move in the environment after they are applied. Some herbicides degrade very quickly in sunlight and can be made inactive before entering the plant while others can persist for years in the soil after they are applied, causing problems for future crops. Registering herbicides can cost hundreds of millions of dollars in order to demonstrate how the chemical moves and degrades within the environment it is applied. Most of this research is conducted by private companies in order to be able to register their products for sale.

== Professional Societies ==
Many professional societies exist for weed scientists to publish research findings and support future research. The Weed Science Society of America (WSSA) is a non-profit professional society that hosts annual conferences and regional conferences in the United States as well as provides guidance on the use of herbicides. For example, the WSSA created a categorization system of herbicides by mode of action that is adopted by all herbicide manufacturers to clearly communicate the way in which each herbicide product impacts plant physiology. By encouraging herbicide applicators to use different modes of action, this reduces the likelihood of herbicide resistant populations of weeds from occurring, thereby stewarding the long-term ability of these weed control products.

Many other professional societies exist for weed science that support the current research challenges of a given country or region. For example, the Indian Society of Weed Science, the Weed Science Society of Japan, and more.
