= Flumetsulam =

Organic compound

- Skeletal formula of flumetsulam

Names
- Preferred IUPAC name N-(2,6-difluorophenyl)-5-methyl-[1,2,4]triazolo[1,5-a]pyrimidine-2-sulfonamide

Identifiers
CAS Number	98967-40-9
3D model (JSmol)	Interactive image
ChEBI	CHEBI:82011
ChEMBL	ChEMBL1389671
ChemSpider	82857
ECHA InfoCard	100.131.589
KEGG	C18852
PubChem CID	91759
UNII	X89F0S6LW8
CompTox Dashboard (EPA)	DTXSID4032615
- InChI: InChI=1S/C12H9F2N5O2S/c1-7-5-6-19-11(15-7)16-12(17-19)22(20,21)18-10-8(13)3-2-4-9(10)14/h2-6,18H,1H3 Key: RXCPQSJAVKGONC-UHFFFAOYSA-N
- SMILES: CC1=NC2=NC(=NN2C=C1)S(=O)(=O)NC3=C(C=CC=C3F)F

Properties
Chemical formula	C_{12}H_{9}F_{2}N_{5}O_{2}S
Molar mass	325.29 g·mol^{−1}
Appearance	White powder
Odor	Odorless
Melting point	250 °C (482 °F; 523 K)
Solubility in water	0.049 g/L
Solubility in ammonia	1600 g/L
Solubility in methanol	400 g/L
Vapor pressure	3.7X10-13 Pascal
Acidity (pK_{a})	4.6

Hazards
- Occupational safety and health (OHS/OSH)
Main hazards	Environment
- GHS labelling
Pictograms	(GHS07: Exclamation mark) (GHS09: Environmental hazard)
Signal word	Warning
Hazard statements	H332, H410
Precautionary statements	P261, P271, P273, P304+P340, P317, P391, P501
Flash point	93 °C (199 °F; 366 K)
- Lethal dose or concentration (LD, LC)
LD_{50} (median dose)	2 mg/kg (rabbit, skin), 5 mg/kg (rat, oral)
LC_{50} (median concentration)	5620 ppm (duck/quail, inhalation)

Pharmacology
- Pharmacokinetics
Biological half-life	5-7 hours
Excretion	50-75% in urine
- Except where otherwise noted, data are given for materials in their standard state (at 25 °C [77 °F], 100 kPa). Infobox references

Flumetsulam is an herbicide of the sulfonamide class.

== Uses ==
Flumetsulam is a herbicide used to control broadleaf weeds in soybean, corn, and other crops. Flumetsulam is used at any point in plant development, the time depending on the formulation, at a maximum use of 80 grams per hectare.

== Toxicity ==
Long term studies on animals have shown that flumetsulam causes extreme renal system damage and can be toxic when eaten or inhaled. It has shown to have no effect on animals that are currently pregnant or their fetus. It harms aquatic life and has long lasting effects.
