= Trifludimoxazin =

Chemical compound

- Skeletal formula of trifludimoxazin

Names
- Preferred IUPAC name 1,5-dimethyl-6-sulfanylidene-3-(2,2,7-trifluoro-3-oxo-4-prop-2-ynyl-1,4-benzoxazin-6-yl)-1,3,5-triazinane-2,4-dione
- Other names Tirexor, trifludimoxazine

Identifiers
CAS Number	1258836-72-4
3D model (JSmol)	Interactive image
ChEBI	CHEBI:141519
ChemSpider	30904995
EC Number	868-354-6
PubChem CID	49831143
UNII	TIF9B68IHN
CompTox Dashboard (EPA)	DTXSID001020461
- InChI: InChI=1S/C16H11F3N4O4S/c1-4-5-22-10-7-9(8(17)6-11(10)27-16(18,19)12(22)24)23-13(25)20(2)15(28)21(3)14(23)26/h1,6-7H,5H2,2-3H3 Key: AZHZOGYUMMIAOF-UHFFFAOYSA-N
- SMILES: CN1C(=O)N(C(=O)N(C1=S)C)C2=CC3=C(C=C2F)OC(C(=O)N3CC#C)(F)F

Properties
Chemical formula	C_{16}H_{11}F_{3}N_{4}O_{4}S
Molar mass	412.34 g·mol^{−1}

Hazards
- GHS labelling
Pictograms	(GHS08: Health hazard) (GHS09: Environmental hazard)
Signal word	Danger
Hazard statements	H360F, H373, H410
Precautionary statements	P203, P260, P273, P280, P318, P319, P391, P405, P501
- Except where otherwise noted, data are given for materials in their standard state (at 25 °C [77 °F], 100 kPa). Infobox references

Trifludimoxazin is a chemical herbicide intended for use in controlling broadleaf weeds in various crops. Its formula is C_{16}H_{11}F_{3}N_{4}O_{4}S, and its mode of action is as a protoporphyrinogen oxidase (PPO) inhibitor. It is sold by BASF as the active ingredient of the herbicidal mixture Tirexor. It has been investigated for its potential to target weeds that have developed resistance to other PPO-targeting herbicides, and has also been investigated for use alongside the herbicide saflufenacil.

The herbicide was classified as having "suggestive evidence of carcinogenic potential" based on animal testing done by the United States Environmental Protection Agency (EPA) in 2021. It was approved for use in the United States by the EPA that year. It was intended for use on soy, fruit, corn and nut crops. The agency was subsequently sued by the nonprofit organizations Center for Food Safety and Center for Biological Diversity due to the compound's potential to "likely cause severe harm" to endangered fish species if used. Trifludimoxazin's manufacturer, BASF, voluntarily stopped manufacturing and selling the chemical in 2022. Four years later, the herbicide was again approved for use in June 2026.
