= 2,3,6-Trichlorobenzoic acid =

Chemical compound

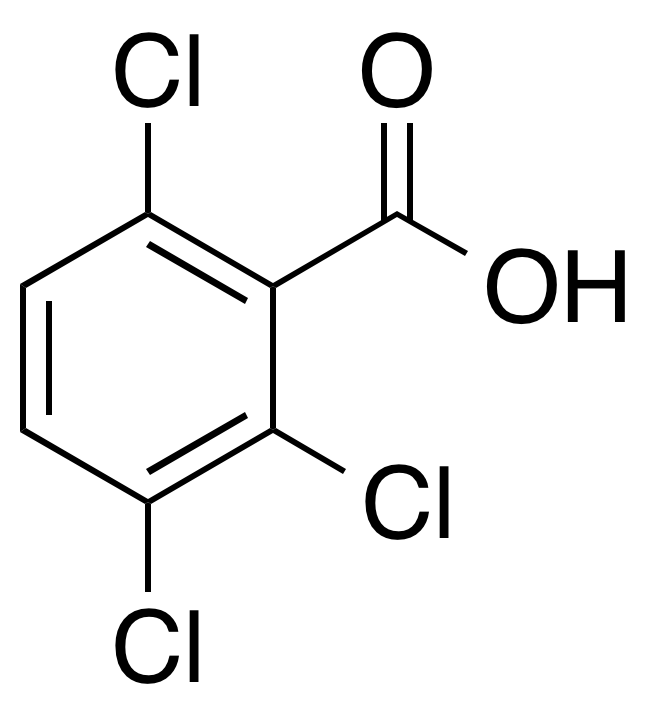

Names
- Preferred IUPAC name 2,3,6-Trichlorobenzoic acid
- Other names 2,3,6-TBA

Identifiers
CAS Number	50-31-7
3D model (JSmol)	Interactive image
ChEBI	CHEBI:81946
ChEMBL	ChEMBL2260696
ChemSpider	5556
ECHA InfoCard	100.000.025
EC Number	200-026-4
PubChem CID	5759
UNII	VI4ST7ZIQG
CompTox Dashboard (EPA)	DTXSID6040296
- InChI: InChI=1S/C7H3Cl3O2/c8-3-1-2-4(9)6(10)5(3)7(11)12/h1-2H,(H,11,12) Key: XZIDTOHMJBOSOX-UHFFFAOYSA-N
- SMILES: C1=CC(=C(C(=C1Cl)C(=O)O)Cl)Cl

Properties
Chemical formula	C_{7}H_{3}Cl_{3}O_{2}
Molar mass	225.45 g·mol^{−1}
Appearance	Colorless crystalline powder
Odor	Odorless
Melting point	124.5 °C (256.1 °F; 397.6 K)
Vapor pressure	0.00055 mmHg
- Except where otherwise noted, data are given for materials in their standard state (at 25 °C [77 °F], 100 kPa). Infobox references

2,3,6-Trichlorobenzoic acid is a post-emergent herbicide. Its formula is C_{7}H_{3}Cl_{3}O_{2}.

In the United States, it has been cancelled for use as an active ingredient in herbicide mixtures and is no longer sold in herbicidal products. It was sold in formulations under a wide variety of trade names, including Benzak and Trysben.

== Safety ==
2,3,6-Trichlorobenzoic acid causes liver damage. It produces hydrogen chloride gas upon heating, which forms corrosive hydrochloric acid upon contact with skin or other body tissues.
