= Quizalofop =

Weed control herbicide

Names
- Preferred IUPAC name 2-[4-(6-chloroquinoxalin-2-yl)oxyphenoxy]propanoic acid
- Other names: Quizalofop; QPE; Xylafop

Identifiers
CAS Number	76578-12-6
3D model (JSmol)	Interactive image
ChEBI	CHEBI:137509
ChemSpider	155628
ECHA InfoCard	100.114.382
KEGG	C18763
PubChem CID	178795
UNII	137F325077
CompTox Dashboard (EPA)	DTXSID60273935
- InChI: InChI=1S/C17H13ClN2O4/c1-10(17(21)22)23-12-3-5-13(6-4-12)24-16-9-19-15-8-11(18)2-7-14(15)20-16/h2-10H,1H3,(H,21,22) Key: ABOOPXYCKNFDNJ-UHFFFAOYSA-N
- SMILES: CC(C(=O)O)OC1=CC=C(C=C1)OC2=CN=C3C=C(C=CC3=N2)Cl

Properties
Chemical formula	C_{17}H_{13}ClN_{2}O_{4}
Molar mass	344.75 g·mol^{−1}
Appearance	White powder

Hazards
- Occupational safety and health (OHS/OSH)
Main hazards	Moderate human toxicity, toxic to fish
- GHS labelling
Hazard statements	H301
- Lethal dose or concentration (LD, LC)
LD_{50} (median dose)	1182 - 1670 mg/kg (rat, oral)
LC_{50} (median concentration)	5.8 mg/L (rat, inhalation, 4 hours); LC₅₀/96 h: 10.7 mg/L (rainbow trout)

Related compounds
Related compounds	Kuicaoxi
- Except where otherwise noted, data are given for materials in their standard state (at 25 °C [77 °F], 100 kPa). Infobox references

Quizalofop is a phenoxy herbicide that works by inhibition of acetyl-CoA-carboxylase to selectively control grasses, without affecting broadleaf crops. It may be shortened to QPE, from Quizalofop-P-ethyl, which is the most common commercial variant of quizalofop. It is used in Australia, Morocco and Europe.

Quizalofop's HRAC classification is Group A (Australia and global), or Group 1 (numeric). Group A herbicides inhibit acetyl CoA carboxylase, (ACCase).

Affected weeds show symptoms after 7 to 10 days, the base and inter-veins become yellow; new growth joints are weak. After 16 days, tips become yellow or red and the plant falls apart. In animal tests, it has been shown not to cause cancer or reproductive problems.

== Application ==
Typically is quizalofop sold as an agricultural emulsifiable concentrate at 100-200 g/L, using solvents of liquid hydrocarbons or N-Methylpyrrolidone. When sprayed on crops, it is most effective in mild, fine weather with rain in the next one or two days. Hot and dry conditions reduce control. Clay content, soil pH or soil organic matter has little effect on QPE. The usual application is through a 30-150 L/Ha tank mix.

QPE is a post-emergent herbicide and is absorbed through the leaves, whence it is quickly translocated to the roots and growing sections of the plant. It has little residual activity after the initial spraying.

== Environmental Behaviour ==
Quizalofop is leached moderately in soil and not expected to leach, having low soil mobility. It is biodegradable, and has a soil-half-life of about 60 days. It is non-toxic to birds and bees.

To bees and birds, QPE is non-toxic, though it is toxic for arthropods and for invertebrates.

== Lists ==
Quizalofop has been used on: beetroot, cabbage, canola, carrots, cauliflower, chickpeas, clover & sub clover, Pastures, cucumbers, faba beans, field peas, honey dew, melon, lucerne, lupins, medic pasture, mung beans, navy beans, onions, potatoes, pumpkins, radish, soybeabs, sunflower and tomatoes.

Quizalofop has been used to control: annual ryegrass, barley grass, brome grasses, wild oats, awnless barnyard grass, Barnyard grass, Couch grass, dinebra, crowsfoot grass, foxtail millet, Columbus grass, Johnsongrass, liverseed grass, rhodes grass, Queensland blue grass, summer grass, paspalum and kikuyu.

== Links ==
- Quizalofop in the Pesticide Properties DataBase (PPDB)
