= Penoxsulam =

Names
- Preferred IUPAC name 2-(2,2-Difluoroethoxy)-N-(5,8-dimethoxy-[1,2,4]triazolo[1,5-c]pyrimidin-2-yl)-6-(trifluoromethyl)benzenesulfonamide

Identifiers
CAS Number	219714-96-2
3D model (JSmol)	Interactive image
ChEBI	CHEBI:81776
ChEMBL	ChEMBL1895913
ChemSpider	9959655
ECHA InfoCard	100.107.359
KEGG	C18481
PubChem CID	11784975
UNII	784ELC1SCZ
CompTox Dashboard (EPA)	DTXSID0034803
- InChI: InChI=1S/C16H14F5N5O5S/c1-29-10-6-22-15(30-2)26-13(10)23-14(24-26)25-32(27,28)12-8(16(19,20)21)4-3-5-9(12)31-7-11(17)18/h3-6,11H,7H2,1-2H3,(H,24,25) Key: SYJGKVOENHZYMQ-UHFFFAOYSA-N
- SMILES: COC1=CN=C(N2C1=NC(=N2)NS(=O)(=O)C3=C(C=CC=C3OCC(F)F)C(F)(F)F)OC

Properties
Chemical formula	C_{16}H_{14}F_{5}N_{5}O_{5}S
Molar mass	483.37 g·mol^{−1}
- Except where otherwise noted, data are given for materials in their standard state (at 25 °C [77 °F], 100 kPa). Infobox references

Penoxsulam is sulfonamide and triazolopyrimidine herbicide that acts as an acetolactate synthase inhibitor. It is primarily used for rice production.

Penoxsulam's HRAC classification is Group B (global, Aus), Group 2 (numeric), as it is an acetohydroxyacid synthase inhibitor.
