= Beflubutamid =

Chemical compound

- Skeletal formula of beflubutamid

Names
- Preferred IUPAC name N-benzyl-2-[4-fluoro-3-(trifluoromethyl)phenoxy]butanamide

Identifiers
CAS Number	113614-08-7
3D model (JSmol)	Interactive image
ChEBI	CHEBI:138203
ChemSpider	4953638
ECHA InfoCard	100.129.750
EC Number	601-267-1
PubChem CID	6451159
UNII	YW9853IQ3U
CompTox Dashboard (EPA)	DTXSID7057941
- InChI: InChI=1S/C18H17F4NO2/c1-2-16(17(24)23-11-12-6-4-3-5-7-12)25-13-8-9-15(19)14(10-13)18(20,21)22/h3-10,16H,2,11H2,1H3,(H,23,24) Key: FFQPZWRNXKPNPX-UHFFFAOYSA-N
- SMILES: CCC(C(=O)NCC1=CC=CC=C1)OC2=CC(=C(C=C2)F)C(F)(F)F

Properties
Chemical formula	C_{18}H_{17}F_{4}NO_{2}
Molar mass	355.333 g·mol^{−1}

Hazards
- GHS labelling
Pictograms	(GHS09: Environmental hazard)
Signal word	Warning
Hazard statements	H410
Precautionary statements	P273, P391, P501
- Except where otherwise noted, data are given for materials in their standard state (at 25 °C [77 °F], 100 kPa). Infobox references

Beflubutamid is a chemical compound and amide. It is used in agriculture as a herbicide. Its chemical formula is C_{18}H_{17}F_{4}NO_{2}.

== Uses ==
Beflubutamid is used on arable land to protect common wheat, barley, triticale and rye crops. The herbicide protects these cultigens from annual dicotyledon weeds.

== Stereochemistry ==
Beflubuitamid has two stereoisomers. The substance as used in agriculture is typically a racemic mixture, a 1:1-mixture of the (S)- and (R)-form:

Enantiomers of beflubutamid
(S)-Beflubutamid	(R)-Beflubutamid

== Method of action and effects ==
Beflybutamid is placed in the HRAC classification group F1 based on its mode of action. Herbicides in HRAC group F1 influence the biosynthesis of carotenoids. The molecular characteristic relevant to this group is the partial tetrafluorocarbon-phenyl structure.

Beflubutamid inhibits the enzyme phytoene desaturase (PDS) in carotenoid biosynthesis. PDS catalyzes the dehydrogenation of phytoene in the synthesis reaction, which is necessary for the final carotenoid synthesis to take place in further reaction steps.

Plants unable to complete carotenoid synthesis will die, as reactive oxygen compounds will build up in the absence of carotenoids. These reactive oxygen compounds cause the oxidation of cholorphylls and a decrease in green colorants. As such, carotenoid synthesis-inhibiting herbicides like beflubutamid are known as "bleaching herbicides".

== Legality ==
Beflubutamid has been approved in the European Union since December 1, 2007. Plant protection products containing beflubutamid are sold in Austria and Germany, but not Switzerland.

== Decomposition in air and soil ==
Beflubutamid has a low vapor pressure of 1.1·10-5 Pa at 25 °C. As such, it does not evaporate under standard conditions. The compound will decompose by reaction with tropospheric hydroxyl radical with a half-life of 3.5 hours (predicted using the Atkinson method), and is unlikely to disperse greatly on its own in air. In soil, beflubutamid decomposes to amide and azide forms, as well as other bound residues and CO_{2}. These degradation products are classified as harmless.

== Decomposition in water ==
Under water at standard conditions (25 °C, pH=5–9), beflubutamid degrades very slowly if at all, and does not decompose via photooxidation at greater depths where light does not travel. This may have the effect of killing algae, which are attacked by beflubutamid. This destruction can have effects on organisms that feed on the algae. High levels of beflubutamid can accumulate at depths of over 200 m, but at this depth algae cannot grow.

== Brand names ==
- BeFlex
