= 4-(4-Chlorophenoxy)butanoic acid =

Chemical compound

- Skeletal formula of 4-(4-chlorophenoxy)butanoic acid

Names
- Preferred IUPAC name 4-(4-Chlorophenoxy)butanoic acid
- Other names 4-CPB

Identifiers
CAS Number	3547-07-7
3D model (JSmol)	Interactive image
ChemSpider	18011
EC Number	109-978-4
PubChem CID	19077
CompTox Dashboard (EPA)	DTXSID70188980
- InChI: InChI=1S/C10H11ClO3/c11-8-3-5-9(6-4-8)14-7-1-2-10(12)13/h3-6H,1-2,7H2,(H,12,13) Key: SIYAHZSHQIPQLY-UHFFFAOYSA-N
- SMILES: C1=CC(=CC=C1OCCCC(=O)O)Cl

Properties
Chemical formula	C_{10}H_{11}ClO_{3}
Molar mass	214.65 g·mol^{−1}

Hazards
- GHS labelling
Pictograms	(GHS05: Corrosive) (GHS07: Exclamation mark)
Signal word	Danger
Hazard statements	H302, H318
Precautionary statements	P264, P264+P265, P270, P280, P301+P317, P305+P354+P338, P317, P330, P501
- Except where otherwise noted, data are given for materials in their standard state (at 25 °C [77 °F], 100 kPa). Infobox references

4-(4-Chlorophenoxy)butanoic acid is an herbicide. Its formula is C_{10}H_{11}ClO_{3}. It is an approved substance under the name 4-CPB by the Weed Science Society of America.

== Uses ==
4-(4-Chlorophenoxy)butanoic acid has been used as a starting material to produce derivatives of benzoxepin, several of which are the subject of research due to their apparent sedative-hypnotic effects.
