= Swep =

Weed control herbicide

Names
- Preferred IUPAC name Methyl N-(3,4-dichlorophenyl)carbamate
- Other names: MCC; FMC 2995; NIA 2995J; Methyl 3,4-dichlorocarbanilate; Methyl 3,4-dichlorophenylcarbamate; Methyl N-(3,4-dichlorophenyl)carbamate; 3,4-Dichlorocarbanilic acid methyl ester; Carbamic acid, (3,4-dichlorophenyl)-, methyl ester

Identifiers
| CAS Number | 1918-18-9 |
| 3D model (JSmol) | Interactive image |
| ChEBI | CHEBI:82188 |
| ChEMBL | ChEMBL1573885 |
| ECHA InfoCard | 100.149.159 |
| EC Number | 620-362-9 |
| KEGG | C19062 |
| PubChem CID | 15969 |
| UNII | 6A0988TW71 |
| CompTox Dashboard (EPA) | DTXSID7042437 |
- InChI: InChI=1S/C8H7Cl2NO2/c1-13-8(12)11-5-2-3-6(9)7(10)4-5/h2-4H,1H3,(H,11,12) Key: WOZQBERUBLYCEG-UHFFFAOYSA-N
- SMILES: COC(=O)NC1=CC(=C(C=C1)Cl)Cl

Properties
| Chemical formula | C_{8}H_{7}Cl_{2}NO_{2} |
| Molar mass | 220.05 g·mol^{−1} |
| Appearance | White crystals |
| Melting point | 110 °C (230 °F; 383 K) |
| Vapor pressure | 187 mPa |

Hazards
- GHS labelling
| Pictograms | (GHS07: Exclamation mark) |
| Hazard statements | H302 |
| Precautionary statements | P264, P270, P301+P317, P330, P501 |
- Lethal dose or concentration (LD, LC)
| LD_{50} (median dose) | 522 mg/kg (rat, oral) |
| LC_{50} (median concentration) | 2.6 mg/L (carp, 48 hour) |
- Except where otherwise noted, data are given for materials in their standard state (at 25 °C [77 °F], 100 kPa). Infobox references

Swep or MCC is a carbamate herbicide discovered in the 1960s, formerly used to control annual weeds and grasses in rice, potatoes, cotton, corn, peas, peanuts, and sorghum, and is no longer used in the US Notably, swep must be applied at high rates per acre compared to other herbicides, 3.75-5.62 kg/Ha (3.35-5.01 lbs/ac.).

== Mechanism of action ==
Swep interferes with cell division and growth.

== Environmental behaviour ==
Swep is relatively volatile, with a vapour pressure of 187 mPa, so swep can be lost to the atmosphere. In a laboratory soil degradation test, the amount of swep in soil halved in 21 days. Degradation is by microbial breakdown, not by chemical means.

3,4-Dichloroaniline (DCA) is swep's primary metabolite, roughly one part in six of which is further transformed to 3,3',4,4'-tetrachloroazobenzene (TCAB). DCA can be broken down (mineralised) by many microbes, including strains of variovorax, sphingomonas and achromobacter. A "consortium" of a couple of bacteria strains can convert swep to DCA and then break down the 3,4-DCA. DCA is an intermediate, and does not accumulate in meaningful quantities are swep decomposes.

== Uses ==
Swep is usually formulated as an emulsifiable concentrate (EC).

Swep can control grasses, broadleaf weeds, and sedges, including barnyard grass, purslane, chenopodium and trifoliate grass.

It is used on cereals and vegetables including leek, green onion and garlic.
