= Karsil =

Names
- Preferred IUPAC name N-(3,4-Dichlorophenyl)-2-methylpentanamide
- Other names: (2RS)-3′,4′-Dichloro-2-methylpentananilide; (RS)-3′,4′-Dichloro-2-methylvaleranilide; N-(3,4-Dichlorophenyl)-2-methylpentanamide; NIA 4562

Identifiers
CAS Number	2533-89-3
3D model (JSmol)	Interactive image
ChemSpider	517504
PubChem CID	595317
UNII	7WAZ49QYN0
CompTox Dashboard (EPA)	DTXSID40871872
- InChI: InChI=1S/C12H15Cl2NO/c1-3-4-8(2)12(16)15-9-5-6-10(13)11(14)7-9/h5-8H,3-4H2,1-2H3,(H,15,16) Key: VUNCGGHZBFQRPB-UHFFFAOYSA-N
- SMILES: CCCC(C)C(=O)NC1=CC(=C(C=C1)Cl)Cl

Properties
Chemical formula	C_{12}H_{15}Cl_{2}NO
Molar mass	260.16 g·mol^{−1}
Density	1222 kg/m^{3}
Melting point	106 °C (223 °F; 379 K)
Boiling point	396 °C (745 °F; 669 K)
Vapor pressure	1.79 nmHg

Hazards
Flash point	193
- Except where otherwise noted, data are given for materials in their standard state (at 25 °C [77 °F], 100 kPa). Infobox references

Karsil (also called erlüjixiancaoan) is an acylanilide herbicide, similar to propanil. It is potent against annual grasses and broadleaved weeds in celery, and a strong inhibitor of photosynthesis. It is approved for use in China.

When degraded by bacteria, karsil becomes 3,4-dichloroaniline and 3,3',4,4,'-tetrachloroazobenzene. Karsil is theorised to form hydrogen bonds with the protein of an enzyme involved in the oxidation of water, creating its herbicidal potential, similar to diuron and atrazine.

Karsil has been manufactured by Niagara Chemical Division. If ingested, activated charcoal absorbs it. Karsil is ten times as active as atrazine at the chloroplast level.
