= Terbumeton =

Names
- IUPAC name 2-N-tert-butyl-4-N-ethyl-6-methoxy-1,3,5-triazine-2,4-diamine

Identifiers
CAS Number	33693-04-8
3D model (JSmol)	Interactive image
ChEBI	CHEBI:81947
ChEMBL	ChEMBL3560827
ChemSpider	33617
ECHA InfoCard	100.046.929
EC Number	251-637-8
KEGG	C18768
PubChem CID	36584
UNII	8Q68893703
CompTox Dashboard (EPA)	DTXSID1042445
- InChI: InChI=1S/C10H19N5O/c1-6-11-7-12-8(15-10(2,3)4)14-9(13-7)16-5/h6H2,1-5H3,(H2,11,12,13,14,15) Key: BCQMBFHBDZVHKU-UHFFFAOYSA-N
- SMILES: CCNC1=NC(=NC(=N1)OC)NC(C)(C)C

Properties
Chemical formula	C_{10}H_{19}N_{5}O
Molar mass	225.296 g·mol^{−1}
Appearance	colorless
Density	1.081 g·cm^{−3}
Melting point	123 °C (253 °F; 396 K)
Solubility in water	120 mg/L
log P	3.1

Hazards
- GHS labelling
Pictograms	(GHS07: Exclamation mark) (GHS09: Environmental hazard)
Signal word	Warning
Hazard statements	H302, H410
Precautionary statements	P264, P270, P273, P301+P317, P330, P391, P501
- Lethal dose or concentration (LD, LC)
LD_{50} (median dose)	433 mg/kg (rat, oral)
- Except where otherwise noted, data are given for materials in their standard state (at 25 °C [77 °F], 100 kPa). Infobox references

Terbumeton is a chemical compound belonging to the triazine group.

== Synthesis ==
Terbumeton can be synthesized by reacting terbuthylazine with sodium methoxide.

== Uses ==
Terbumeton is used as a selective herbicide to control grasses and broadleaf weeds.

== Approval ==
Terbumeton is not included on the list of active substances approved for use in plant protection products in the European Union. In Germany, Austria, and Switzerland, no plant protection products containing this active substance are approved.
