= Hexazinone =

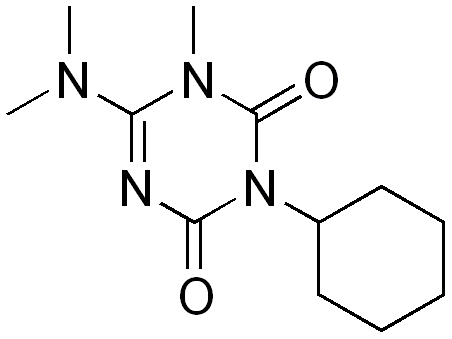

Names
- Preferred IUPAC name 3-Cyclohexyl-6-(dimethylamino)-1-methyl-1,3,5-triazine-2,4(1H,3H)-dione
- Other names Hexazinone

Identifiers
CAS Number	51235-04-2
3D model (JSmol)	Interactive image; Interactive image
ChEBI	CHEBI:5705
ChEMBL	ChEMBL2252598
ChemSpider	36542
ECHA InfoCard	100.051.869
EC Number	257-074-4
KEGG	C10926
PubChem CID	39965
UNII	Y51727MR1Y
CompTox Dashboard (EPA)	DTXSID4024145
- InChI: InChI=1S/C12H20N4O2/c1-14(2)10-13-11(17)16(12(18)15(10)3)9-7-5-4-6-8-9/h9H,4-8H2,1-3H3 Key: CAWXEEYDBZRFPE-UHFFFAOYSA-N; InChI=1/C12H20N4O2/c1-14(2)10-13-11(17)16(12(18)15(10)3)9-7-5-4-6-8-9/h9H,4-8H2,1-3H3 Key: CAWXEEYDBZRFPE-UHFFFAOYAU
- SMILES: O=C(N1C2CCCCC2)N=C(N(C)C)N(C)C1=O; O=C1/N=C(\N(C(=O)N1C2CCCCC2)C)N(C)C

Properties
Chemical formula	C_{12}H_{20}N_{4}O_{2}
Molar mass	252.31
Appearance	White crystalline solid
Density	1.25 g/cm^{3}
Melting point	116 °C (241 °F; 389 K)
Solubility in water	Soluble

Hazards
- GHS labelling
Pictograms	(GHS07: Exclamation mark) (GHS09: Environmental hazard)
Signal word	Warning
Hazard statements	H302, H319, H332, H410
Precautionary statements	P261, P264, P264+P265, P270, P271, P273, P280, P301+P317, P304+P340, P305+P351+P338, P317, P330, P337+P317, P391, P501
- Except where otherwise noted, data are given for materials in their standard state (at 25 °C [77 °F], 100 kPa). verify (what is ?) Infobox references

Hexazinone is an organic compound that is used as a broad spectrum herbicide. It is a colorless solid. It exhibits some solubility in water but is highly soluble in most organic solvents except alkanes. A member of the triazine class herbicides, it is manufactured by DuPont and sold under the trade name Velpar.

It functions by inhibiting photosynthesis and thus is a nonselective herbicide. It is used to control grasses, broadleaf, and woody plants. In the United States approximately 33% is used on alfalfa, 31% in forestry, 29% in industrial areas, 4% on rangeland and pastures, and < 2% on sugarcane.

Hexazinone's HRAC classification is Group C1, Group C (global, Aus), Group 5 (numeric), as it inhibits photosynthesis at photosystem II.

Hexazinone is a pervasive groundwater contaminant. Use of hexazinone causes groundwater to be at high risk of contamination due to the high leaching potential it exhibits.

== History ==
Hexazinone is widely used as a herbicide. It is a non-selective herbicide from the triazine family. It is used among a broad range of places. It is used to control weeds within all sort of applications. From sugarcane plantations, forestry field nurseries, pineapple plantations to high- and railway grasses and industrial plant sites.

Hexazinone was first registered in 1975 for the overall control of weeds and later for uses in crops.

== Structure and reactivity ==
Triazines like hexazinone can bind to the D-1 quinone protein of the electron transport chain in photosystem II to inhibit the photosynthesis. These diverted electrons can thereby damage membranes and destroy cells.

== Synthesis ==
Hexazinone can be synthesized in two different reaction processes. One process starts with a reaction of methyl chloroformate with cyanamide, forming hexazinone after a five-step pathway:

A second synthesis starts with methylthiourea.:

== Degradation ==
The degradation of hexazinone has long been studied. It degrades approximately 10% in five weeks, when exposed to artificial sunlight in distilled water. However, degradation in natural waters can be three to seven times greater. Surprisingly, the pH and the temperature of the water do not affect the photodegradation significantly. It is mainly degraded by aerobic microorganisms in soils.

== Mechanism of action ==
Hexazinone is a broad-spectrum residual and contact herbicide, rapidly absorbed by the leaves and roots. It is tolerated by many conifers, and therefore it is a very effective herbicide for the control for annual and perennial broadleaf weeds, some grasses, and some woody species. Hexazinone works as rain or snowmelt makes it possible for the herbicide to move downward into the soil. There the hexazinone is absorbed from the soil by the roots. It moves through the conductive tissues to the leaves, where it blocks the photosynthesis of the plant within the chloroplasts. Hexazinone binds to a protein of the photosystem II complex, which blocks the electron transport. The result are multiple following reactions. First triplet-state chlorophyll reacts with oxygen to form singlet oxygen. Both chlorophyll and singlet oxygen then remove hydrogen ions from the unsaturated lipids present in the cells and the organelle membranes, forming lipid radicals. These radicals will oxidize other lipids and proteins, eventually resulting in loss of the membrane integrity of the cells and organelles. This will result in a loss of chlorophyll, leakage of cellular contents, cell death, and eventually death of the plant. Woody plants first show yellowing of the leaves before they start to defoliate, eventually they will die. Sometimes plants are able to refoliate and defoliate again during the growing season.
