= Kuicaoxi =

Chemical compound

- Skeletal formula of kuicaoxi

Names
- IUPAC name ethyl (2RS)-2-{{(2RS)-2-{4-[(6-chloroquinoxalin-2-yl)oxy]phenoxy}propanoyl]oxy}-3-methylbut-3-enoate
- Other names SYP-1924

Identifiers
CAS Number	874303-29-4
3D model (JSmol)	Interactive image
ChemSpider	28290036
PubChem CID	57418245
CompTox Dashboard (EPA)	DTXSID801022035
- InChI: InChI=1S/C24H23ClN2O6/c1-5-30-24(29)22(14(2)3)33-23(28)15(4)31-17-7-9-18(10-8-17)32-21-13-26-20-12-16(25)6-11-19(20)27-21/h6-13,15,22H,2,5H2,1,3-4H3 Key: DJSHNWJVTGYEGI-UHFFFAOYSA-N; InChI=1S/C24H23ClN2O6/c1-5-30-24(29)22(14(2)3)33-23(28)15(4)31-17-7-9-18(10-8-17)32-21-13-26-20-12-16(25)6-11-19(20)27-21/h6-13,15,22H,2,5H2,1,3-4H3/t15-,22?/m1/s1 Key: DJSHNWJVTGYEGI-JGHKVMFLSA-N
- SMILES: CCOC(=O)C(C(=C)C)OC(=O)C(C)OC1=CC=C(C=C1)OC2=CN=C3C=C(C=CC3=N2)Cl

Properties
Chemical formula	C_{24}H_{23}ClN_{2}O_{6}
Molar mass	470.91 g·mol^{−1}

Related compounds
Related compounds	Quizalofop
- Except where otherwise noted, data are given for materials in their standard state (at 25 °C [77 °F], 100 kPa). Infobox references

Kuicaoxi (Chinese: 喹草烯) is a phenoxy herbicide registered for use in China. Its formula is C_{24}H_{23}ClN_{2}O_{6}. It is an ester of the herbicide quizalofop.

== Uses ==
Kuicaoxi is a post-emergent herbicide, and is effective against grasses such as Echinochloa crus-galli.
