= Sethoxydim =

Names
- IUPAC name 2-[(E)-N-Ethoxy-C-propylcarbonimidoyl]-5-(2-ethylsulfanylpropyl)-3-hydroxycyclohex-2-en-1-one

Identifiers
CAS Number	74051-80-2
3D model (JSmol)	Interactive image
ChEBI	CHEBI:81815
ChemSpider	16736024
ECHA InfoCard	100.070.600
EC Number	277-682-3
KEGG	C18539
PubChem CID	135491830
UNII	1189NNQ8F6
CompTox Dashboard (EPA)	DTXSID9024304
- InChI: InChI=1S/C17H29NO3S/c1-5-8-14(18-21-6-2)17-15(19)10-13(11-16(17)20)9-12(4)22-7-3/h12-13,19H,5-11H2,1-4H3/b18-14+ Key: CSPPKDPQLUUTND-NBVRZTHBSA-N
- SMILES: CCC/C(=N\OCC)/C1=C(CC(CC1=O)CC(C)SCC)O

Properties
Chemical formula	C_{17}H_{29}NO_{3}S
Molar mass	327.48 g·mol^{−1}
- Except where otherwise noted, data are given for materials in their standard state (at 25 °C [77 °F], 100 kPa). Infobox references

Sethoxydim is a postemergent herbicide for control of grass weeds in a wide variety of horticultural crops.

Sethoxydim is sold under brand names including Poast, Torpedo, Ultima, Vantage, Conclude, and Rezult. It is manufactured by BASF, TopPro, and Monterey Lawn and Garden.

== Mode of Action ==
Sethoxydim is a substituted 1,3-cyclohexanedione DIM herbicide, a type of Acetyl-CoA carboxylase inhibitor (ACCase herbicide), WSSA/HRAC Group 1 (formerly in HRAC A).

== Resistance ==
=== Resistant crops ===
Maize (corn) resistant to ACCase inhibitors has been produced by selection under sethoxydim application.
