= Prometon =

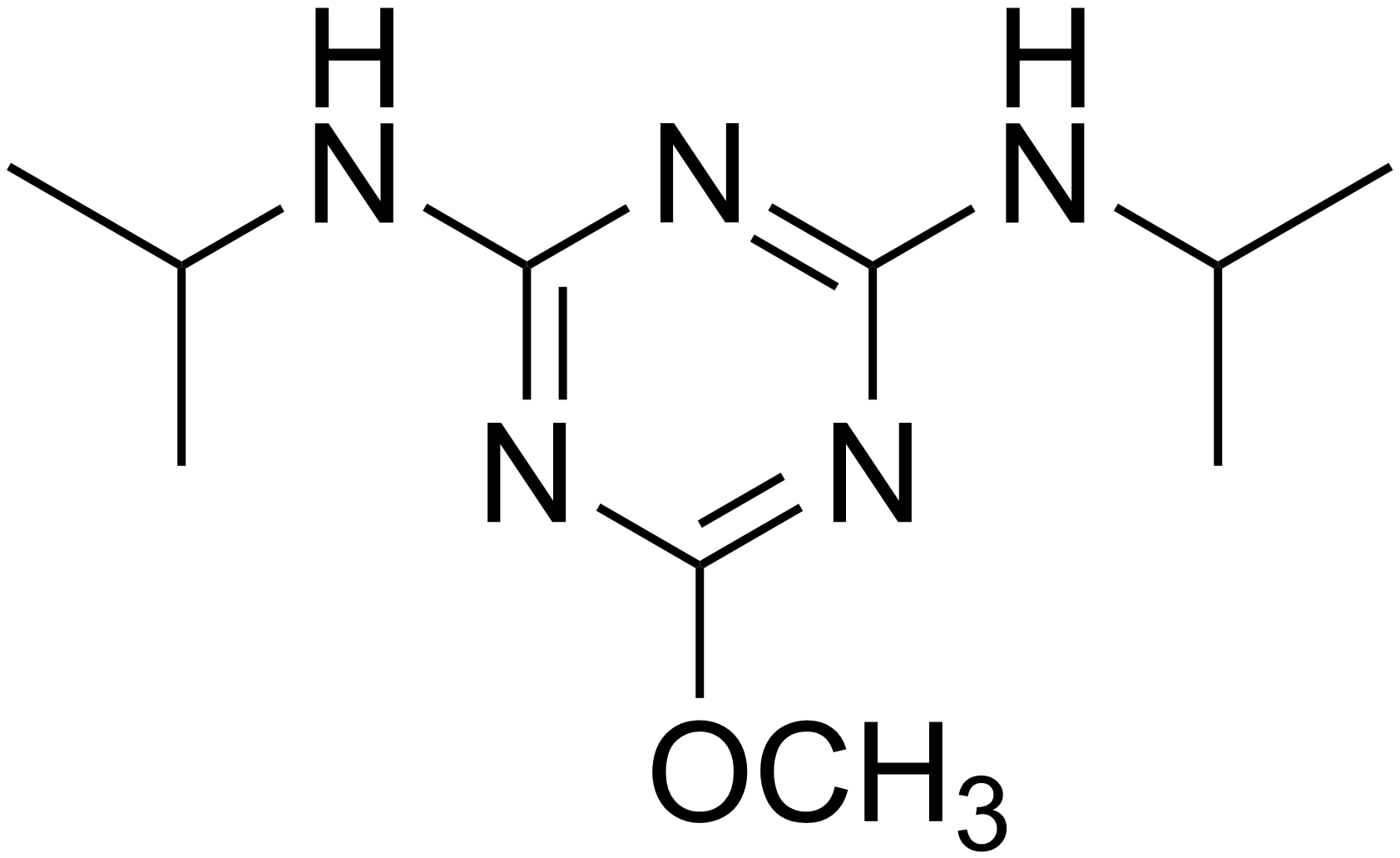

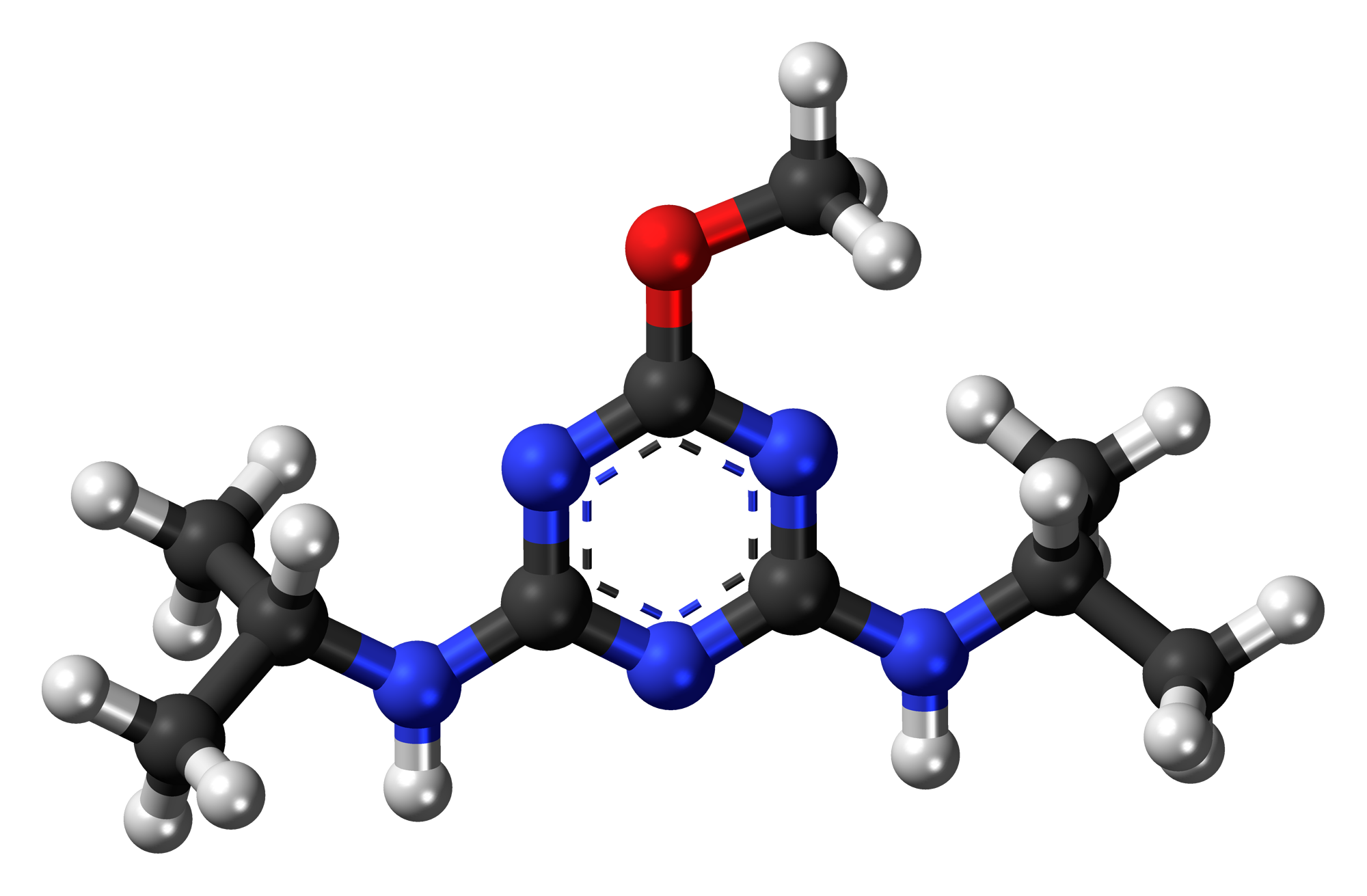

Names
- Preferred IUPAC name 6-Methoxy-N^{2},N^{4}-di(propan-2-yl)-1,3,5-triazine-2,4-diamine

Identifiers
CAS Number	1610-18-0
3D model (JSmol)	Interactive image
ChEBI	CHEBI:34934
ChEMBL	ChEMBL1486524
ChemSpider	4759
ECHA InfoCard	100.015.044
EC Number	216-548-0
KEGG	C14186
PubChem CID	4928
UNII	DY7SQ0399L
CompTox Dashboard (EPA)	DTXSID6022341
- InChI: InChI=1S/C10H19N5O/c1-6(2)11-8-13-9(12-7(3)4)15-10(14-8)16-5/h6-7H,1-5H3,(H2,11,12,13,14,15) Key: ISEUFVQQFVOBCY-UHFFFAOYSA-N; InChI=1/C10H19N5O/c1-6(2)11-8-13-9(12-7(3)4)15-10(14-8)16-5/h6-7H,1-5H3,(H2,11,12,13,14,15) Key: ISEUFVQQFVOBCY-UHFFFAOYAG
- SMILES: CC(C)NC1=NC(=NC(=N1)OC)NC(C)C

Properties
Chemical formula	C_{10}H_{19}N_{5}O
Molar mass	225.29 g/mol
- Except where otherwise noted, data are given for materials in their standard state (at 25 °C [77 °F], 100 kPa). verify (what is ?) Infobox references

Prometon is a herbicide for annual and perennial broad-leaf weed, brush and grass control mainly in non-cropping situations.

Prometon's HRAC classification is Group C1, Group C (global, Aus), Group 5 (numeric), as it inhibits photosynthesis at photosystem II.
