= British Crop Production Council =

UK agricultural organisation

- Abbreviation: BCPC
- Formation: 1967
- Legal status: Non-profit company and Registered charity
- Purpose: Crop production in the UK
- Location: 7 Omni Business Centre, Omega Park, Alton, Hampshire, UK
- Region served: UK
- General Manager: Chris Todd
- Main organ: Executive Board
- Affiliations: NFU, NIAB, Environment Agency, BBSRC, DARDNI, NERC, SCI, DEFRA, BSPP
- Website: British Crop Production Council

The British Crop Production Council (BCPC) is an organisation that promotes the use of good science and technology in the understanding and application of effective and sustainable crop production. BCPC is a Registered Charity and a Company limited by Guarantee.

== Function ==
The key objectives of BPCP are to:

- Identify developing issues in the science and practice of crop protection and production, and provide informed, independent analysis and views on these to opinion formers, government and the public
- Publish definitive information for growers, advisors and other stakeholders in the food, fuel and fibre production chain, in the form of reference works, manuals and handbooks
- Organise and co-host conferences and symposia to provide platforms for the reporting and debate of scientific relevant results and opinion
- Contribute to the future of UK (bio) science by providing publications for schools which stimulate interest and learning.

== History ==
BCPC was formed in 1967 by the amalgamation of the British Weed Control Council and the British Insecticide and Fungicide Council under the presidency of Sir Frederick Bawden, who was Director of then Rothamsted Experimental Station.

== Function ==
BCPC achieves its objectives through the delivery of the following products and services:

1. Informed and Independent Analysis and Opinion
  news releases reflecting outputs from Expert Working Groups (Weeds, Pests and Diseases, Applications and Seed Treatment) and individual board members
  responses to consultations and briefs for MPs, DEFRA.
2. Definitive Crop Production/Protection Information
  The Pesticide Manual, The Manual of BioControl Agents, The UK Pesticide Guide
  Technical training handbooks covering - Field Scale Spraying, Small Scale Spraying, Using Pesticides, Spreading Fertilisers and Applying Slug Pellets and Safety Equipment Handbook
  On-line resources – www.plantprotection.co.uk, New Crop Opportunities, Identipest, Garden Detective, the weekly BCPC News
3. Conferences and Symposia
  the international BCPC Congress and Exhibition
  specialist science and technology symposia
  fora for stakeholders throughout the food chain
4. Science Education
  Beginners Life Science Series;
  Beginners Physical Science Series

== See also ==
- Agriculture in the United Kingdom
