= BCPC (herbicide) =

Obsolete carbamate herbicide

Names
- IUPAC name (2RS)-butan-2-yl (3-chlorophenyl)carbamate
- Preferred IUPAC name rac-(2R)-butan-2-yl (3-chlorophenyl)carbamate
- Other names: NSC-74793; NSC-2475; BP 9; sec-butyl N-(3-chlorophenyl)carbamate; 1-methylpropyl N-(3-chlorophenyl)carbamate; sec-Butyl alcohol, m-chlorocarbanilate

Identifiers
CAS Number	2164-13-8
3D model (JSmol)	Interactive image
ChemSpider	15701
PubChem CID	16561
UNII	2N91I87D2B
- InChI: InChI=1S/C11H14ClNO2/c1-3-8(2)15-11(14)13-10-6-4-5-9(12)7-10/h4-8H,3H2,1-2H3,(H,13,14) Key: CURLHBZYTFVCRG-UHFFFAOYSA-N
- SMILES: CCC(C)OC(=O)NC1=CC(=CC=C1)Cl

Properties
Chemical formula	C_{11}H_{14}ClNO_{2}
Molar mass	227.69 g·mol^{−1}
Density	1,193 kg/cu.m
Boiling point	269.4 °C (516.9 °F; 542.5 K)

Hazards
Flash point	116.8 °C (242.2 °F; 389.9 K)
- Except where otherwise noted, data are given for materials in their standard state (at 25 °C [77 °F], 100 kPa). Infobox references

BCPC (short for butan-2-yl (3-chlorophenyl)carbamate) is a defunct carbamate herbicide used prëemergently to control weeds on cotton. It was widely used in the 1970s, rare by the 2000s and considered obsolete in 2010.

It is not registered for use in the UK or the EU.

Chemically, BCPC is racemic.

Under the HRAC classification BCPC is a Group E (Australia), Group K2 (global), Group 23 (numeric) herbicide, acting by inhibiting cell division and microtubule organization and polymerization.
