= Clethodim =

Names
- IUPAC name 2-[(E)-N-[(E)-3-chloroprop-2-enoxy]-C-ethylcarbonimidoyl]-5-(2-ethylsulfanylpropyl)-3-hydroxycyclohex-2-en-1-one
- Other names Centurion, Centurion Plus, Chevron RE 45601, cletodime

Identifiers
CAS Number	99129-21-2
3D model (JSmol)	Interactive image
ChEBI	CHEBI:70721
ChEMBL	ChEMBL111058
ChemSpider	11677232
ECHA InfoCard	100.128.422
EC Number	619-396-7
KEGG	C18609
PubChem CID	135491728
UNII	05SB62IB6F
CompTox Dashboard (EPA)	DTXSID3034458
- InChI: InChI=1S/C17H26ClNO3S/c1-4-14(19-22-8-6-7-18)17-15(20)10-13(11-16(17)21)9-12(3)23-5-2/h6-7,12-13,20H,4-5,8-11H2,1-3H3/b7-6+,19-14+ Key: SILSDTWXNBZOGF-KUZBFYBWSA-N
- SMILES: CC/C(=N\OC/C=C/Cl)/C1=C(CC(CC1=O)CC(C)SCC)O

Properties
Chemical formula	C_{17}H_{26}ClNO_{3}S
Molar mass	359.91 g·mol^{−1}

Hazards
- GHS labelling
Pictograms	(GHS07: Exclamation mark)
Signal word	Warning
Hazard statements	H302, H317, H412
Precautionary statements	P261, P264, P270, P272, P273, P280, P301+P312, P302+P352, P321, P330, P333+P313, P363, P501
- Except where otherwise noted, data are given for materials in their standard state (at 25 °C [77 °F], 100 kPa). Infobox references

Clethodim (or cletodime) is an herbicide of the cyclohexanedione family. It is used to control grasses, especially annual ryegrass (Lolium rigidum). Although impure samples appear yellowish, the compound is colorless.

Clethodim's HRAC classification is Group A (Australia and global) or Group 1 (numeric). Group A herbicides inhibit acetyl-CoA carboxylase (ACCase).
