= Weed Science Society of America =

- Abbreviation: WSSA
- Formation: 1956
- Type: Nonprofit, learned society
- Legal status: Active
- Purpose: Promote research, education, and extension outreach in weed science; provide science-based information to the public and policymakers; foster awareness of weeds and their impact 4
- Location: United States
- Region served: International
- Methods: Research, education, extension outreach 5
- Fields: Weed science
- Members: Yes (individual, organizational, student, emeritus, honorary)
- Official language: English
- President: Scott Senseman (2018-2019)
- Publication: Weed Science (formerly Weeds); Weed Technology, Invasive Plant Science and Management
- Funding: Membership dues, subscriptions, grants

The Weed Science Society of America (WSSA) is a nonprofit, learned society focused on weed science. It was founded in 1956. The organization promotes research, education, and extension outreach, provides science-based information to the public and policy makers, and fosters awareness of weeds and their impact on both managed and natural ecosystems. President for 2018-19 is Scott Senseman from the University of Tennessee.

WSSA has started the International Survey of Herbicide Resistant Weeds initiative to collect herbicide resistances. The WSSA classifies all herbicides by the mode of action.

In 2017, WSSA began a partnership with Cambridge University Press to continue publication of the three WSSA journals: Weed Science (formerly Weeds) ISSN 0043-1745, Weed Technology ISSN 0890-037X, and Invasive Plant Science and Management ISSN 1939-747X.
