= Ioxynil =

Herbicide active ingredient

Names
- IUPAC name 4-Hydroxy-3,5-diiodophenyl cyanide
- Other names Iodoxynil, Ioxinil, Jioxynil, Ioxynil phenol

Identifiers
CAS Number	1689-83-4
3D model (JSmol)	Interactive image
ChEBI	CHEBI:81821
ChEMBL	ChEMBL509523
ChemSpider	14774
ECHA InfoCard	100.015.347
KEGG	C18546
PubChem CID	15530
UNII	8Y734M4V9E
UN number	2588
CompTox Dashboard (EPA)	DTXSID8022161
- InChI: InChI=1S/C7H3I2NO/c8-5-1-4(3-10)2-6(9)7(5)11/h1-2,11H Key: NRXQIUSYPAHGNM-UHFFFAOYSA-N
- SMILES: C1=C(C=C(C(=C1I)O)I)C#N

Properties
Chemical formula	C_{7}H_{3}I_{2}NO
Molar mass	370.916 g·mol^{−1}
Appearance	Crystalline colourless
Odor	Phenol-like
Melting point	212 °C (414 °F; 485 K)
Solubility in water	0.05 g/L
Solubility in acetone	7 %w/v
Solubility in dimethylformide	74 %w/v
Solubility in ethanol	2 %w/v
Solubility in cyclohexane	14 %w/v
Solubility in tetrahydrofuran	34 %w/v
Solubility in benzene	0.5 %w/v
Vapor pressure	< 0.001 Pa

Hazards
- GHS labelling
Pictograms	(GHS06: Toxic) (GHS08: Health hazard) (GHS09: Environmental hazard)
Signal word	Danger
Hazard statements	H301, H319, H361, H410
- Lethal dose or concentration (LD, LC)
LD_{50} (median dose)	110 mg/kg (rat, oral)
LC_{50} (median concentration)	0.38 mg/L (rat, inhalation), 6.8 mg/L (fish)

Related compounds
Related compounds	Bromoxynil, chloroxynil, Bromoxynil octanoate
- Except where otherwise noted, data are given for materials in their standard state (at 25 °C [77 °F], 100 kPa). Infobox references

Ioxynil is a post-emergent selective nitrile herbicide. It is used in Australia, New Zealand, South Africa, (Note: In South Africa, ioxynil is registered for use on sugar-cane.) Iran and Japan to control broadleaf weeds via the inhibition of photosynthesis. It is used notably on onion crops, among others, normally at 300–900 g/Ha. It was introduced in 1966. The supply of ioxynil is decreasing, as of 2019 but the herbicide remains effective.

== History ==
Ioxynil and bromoxynil (along with 2,4-DB and MCPB) were patented by Louis Wain as joint-head of the chemistry department at Wye College, and coincidentally discovered independently by May & Baker in England screening spare nitriles for herbicide activity, and by Amchem Products Inc in America doing similar screening, all in 1963. Commercial prospects were promising, as cereals could tolerate large amounts, over 2 lbs/ac; even 4 lbs/ac only temporarily scorches.

Wain theorised ioxynil and bromoxynil, the nitrile (-CN) group herbicides, because of the chemical similarity to a nitro (NO_{2}) group, and on their success, the -SO_{2}CH_{3} group was explored, leading to the discovery of methylsulphone herbicides.

May & Baker, a subsidiary of Rhone-Poulenc began ioxynil's, and the very similar bromoxynil's, production in Norwich in 1965, where it has continued for over 40 years. By 1968, ioxynil (as "Buctril") was registered for use in the USA, Canada, the UK, Australia, New Zealand, Japan, the West Indies and most of Europe.

In the 2010s, ioxynil was produced in South Africa to alleviate shortages.

== Regulations ==
Today, ioxynil is banned in the EU and used in Brazil, Iran, China (as octanoate), and New Zealand.

The UK followed the EU's ban (taking effect 1 September 2015) to ban ioxynil's sale; the European approval lapsing under Regulation (EC) 1107/2009.

India and Columbia raised concerns about the EU's maximum allowed residue for ioxynil (amongst other pesticides), saying the EU's stance was too precautionary and based on incolclusive evidence. Bayer, Syngenta and others launched a lawsuit against the 2022 ban on exporting EU-prohibited pesticides from the EU to nations where they are legal, however the French Constitutional Court has upheld the ban.

In Australia, ioxynil is approved as of 2025 in all states, and was registered in 1994 or earlier.

== Properties ==
Ioxynil is a flammable solid with a weak phenolic smell and decays under UV light. Ioxynil's octanoate, ioxynil octanoate, or 4-cyan-2,6-diiodphenyloctanoate, is likewise a colourless insoluble solid and hydrolyses to ioxynil in basic conditions.

The taste of ioxynil is "slight, not characteristic."

== Mechanism and effect ==
Ioxynil acts via photosynthesis inhibition. It and bromoxynil uncouple oxidative phosphorylation and inhibit photosynthetic phosphorylation. Ioxynil additionally breaks down into iodide ions which inhibit plant growth again. Ioxynil may also inhibit photoreduction of ferricyanide, fixation of carbon dioxide, photoreduction of NAPD or of endogenous plastoquinone. Ioxynil acts as an electron transport inhibitor and uncoupling agent.

Symptoms on weeds appear after a few hours or days. Areas of collapsed tissue appear, rapidly becoming necrotic. In good conditions on small plants, necrosis may complete within two days but some weeds can take up to three weeks to die. Effectiveness is enhanced if any times of high humidity occur 1 or 2 days after application. Light and temperature speed up herbicidal action.

Ioxynil is a Group C, (Australia), C3 (Global) or Group 6, (numeric) resistance class herbicide.

== Toxicology ==
Ioxynil is toxic to mammals, with an oral LD_{50} of 110 mg/kg (rats), dermal LD_{50} of 800 mg/kg, and inhalative LC_{50} of 0.38 mg/L over four hours. Ioxynil is toxic to fish, with a 96 hour LC_{50} of 6.8 mg/L, and 3.9 mg/L for daphnia. Plankton and bloodworms are also effected. The oral LD_{50}s in mice, guinea-pigs, rabbits and dogs respectively are 230, 76, 180, > 100 mg/kg.

Ioxynil can affect the human thyroid via binding to transthyretin, a thyroid hormone binding protein which transports thyroid hormone in the blood. It can provoke thyroid tumors in rats, and can disrupt zebrafish's heart development.

Ioxynil is slightly more toxic than the related chloroxynil and bromoxynil due to the heavier iodine halogens.

== Environmental fate ==
Ioxynil is a contact herbicide and has no residual soil activity or translocation, so spray coverage must be thorough as unsprayed weeds will not be controlled; large enough weeds may even contain surviving portions that resprout, and resistance can occur at later growth stages. Translocated chemical may produce chlorosis but is unlikely to be lethal.

Ioxynil bioaccumulates, although it does not linger long in the environment. Ioxynil, bromoxynil, and their octanoate variants, leave negligible residues after use on crops. In all cases, under 0.01 ppm, the limit of detection, though some inactive content may be adsorbed into the soil. Ioxynil breaks down photochemically, first by breaking the halogen iodine free. It persists for about a month in 20°C aerobic soil, shortened to two weeks in anaerobic soil.

== Variants ==
Diagram of ioxynil's variants

Ioxynil has several variants: ioxynil octanoate, ioxynil lithium and ioxynil sodium. "Ioxynil phenol" is another name for the base material. Chemical properties on this page are accurate for base ioxynil, even though much, perhaps most, of commercial ioxynil is ioxynil octanoate.

Variant Properties
Variant	Ioxynil	Ioxynil octanoate	Ioxynil-lithium	Ioxynil-sodium
CAS No.	1689-83-4	3861-47-0	2961-61-7	2961-62-8
Molar Mass	370.91	497.1	376.83	392.9
Solubility (g/L)	3.034	0.00003		140
Melting Pt (°C)	207.8	56.6	282.6	360
Density (g/mL)	2.72	1.81		
LD_{50} (rat, oral) (mg/kg)	130	165	711	112

== Lists ==
Ioxynil is or has been sold under these tradenames: Ioxynil, Unyunox, Totril, Toxynil, Hawk, Hocks, Sanoxynil, Iotril, Certrol, Actril, Actrilawn, Bentrol, Belgran, Bronx, Cipotril, Dantril, Oxytril, Mextrol-Biox, Sanoxynil, Shamseer-2, Stellox, Iotox, Iconix and Trevespan. Some products include multiple active ingredients.

Ioxynil has been sold in formulations also containing bromoxynil and isoproturon.

It is used to control these weeds: bellvine, burr medic, capeweed, chickweed, climbing buckwheat, common heliotrope, common sowthistle, corn gromwell, dandelion, dead nettle, fat-hen, fumitory, green amaranth, green crumbleweed, bittercress, ox tongue, pigweed, potato weed, saffron thistle, scarlet pimpernel, shepherd's purse, slender celery, smallflower mallow, stagger weed, threecornered Jack, three flowered nightshade, turnip weed, Ward's weed, wild radish, wild turnip, wireweed, annual sowthistle, cornbind, musky storksbill, willow weed, buttercup, field pansy, groundsel, plantain, speedwell, stinking mayweed, the knotweed family broadly, in particular tartary buckwheat, the composite or sunflower family, chamomile, mayweed, some borages, fiddlenecks, gromwells and prickly paddy melon.

Crops situations which ioxynil has been used on include: onions, spring onions, welsh onions, garlic onions, cereals, leeks, garlic, shallots, flax, sugarcane, forage grasses, lawns and turf. Peas, oats, maize, sorghum and rice show high tolerance. Limited resistance is seen in lucerne, clover and carrot.
