= Bromoxynil nitrilase =

Class of enzymes

Identifiers
- EC no.: 3.5.5.6
- CAS no.: 157857-12-0

Databases
- BRENDA: enzyme data
- ExPASy: NiceZyme view
- KEGG: enzyme entry
- MetaCyc: metabolic pathway
- Rhea: reactions
- PDB structures: RCSB PDB PDBe PDBsum
- Gene Ontology: AmiGO / QuickGO
Search
- PMC: articles
- PubMed: articles
- NCBI: proteins

Bromoxynil nitrilase (EC 3.5.5.6) is an enzyme characterised from the bacterium, Klebsiella ozaenue, that catalyzes the hydrolysis of the herbicide, bromoxynil to 3,5-dibromo-4-hydroxybenzoic acid and ammonia:

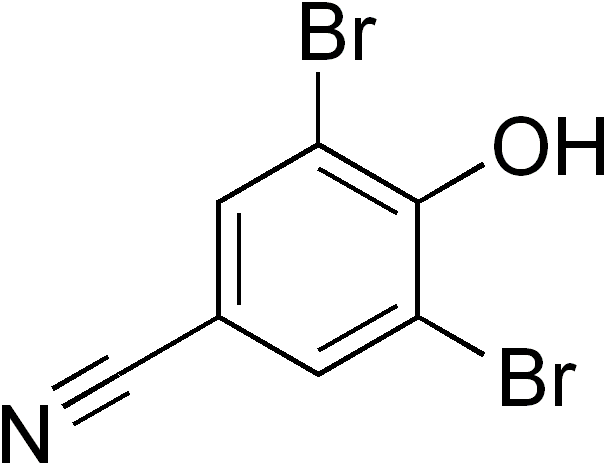

bromoxynil

2 H_{2}O
NH_{3}

3,5-dibromo-4-hydroxybenzoic acid

Transgenic plants incorporating the gene for this enzyme become resistant to the herbicide.

This enzyme is a hydrolase, one acting on carbon-nitrogen bonds other than peptide bonds, specifically in nitriles. The systematic name of this enzyme class is 3,5-dibromo-4-hydroxybenzonitrile aminohydrolase.
