= Ioxynil octanoate =

Variant of the herbicide Ioxynil

Names
- IUPAC name 4-cyano-2,6-diiodophenyl octanoate
- Other names: ioxynil-octanoate; ioxinil oktansyraester (Swedish)

Identifiers
CAS Number	3861-47-0
3D model (JSmol)	Interactive image
ChEBI	CHEBI:81928
ChEMBL	ChEMBL2272565
ChemSpider	18586
ECHA InfoCard	100.021.252
EC Number	223-375-4
KEGG	C18740
PubChem CID	19730
UNII	75K1F1JBKR
CompTox Dashboard (EPA)	DTXSID8042054
- InChI: InChI=1S/C15H17I2NO2/c1-2-3-4-5-6-7-14(19)20-15-12(16)8-11(10-18)9-13(15)17/h8-9H,2-7H2,1H3 Key: QBEXFUOWUYCXNI-UHFFFAOYSA-N
- SMILES: CCCCCCCC(=O)OC1=C(C=C(C=C1I)C#N)I

Properties
Chemical formula	C_{15}H_{17}I_{2}NO_{2}
Molar mass	497.115 g·mol^{−1}
Appearance	Fine white powder
Density	1.81 t/m^{3}
Melting point	56.6 °C (133.9 °F; 329.8 K)
Boiling point	decomposes at 240°C
Solubility in water	0.03 mg/L
Solubility in acetone	1000 g/L
Solubility in ethyl acetate	1000 g/L
Solubility in methanol	111.8 g/L
Solubility in xylene	1000 g/L

Hazards
- GHS labelling
Pictograms	(GHS06: Toxic) (GHS08: Health hazard) (GHS09: Environmental hazard)
Signal word	Danger
Hazard statements	H301+H311, H317, H319, H361, H410
Precautionary statements	P201, P261, P264, P273, P280, P301+P310+P330, P302, P313, P333+P313, P391
- Lethal dose or concentration (LD, LC)
LD_{50} (median dose)	oral (rat) 190 mg/kg
LC_{50} (median concentration)	inhalation (rat) >2,400 mg/m3

Related compounds
Related compounds	Ioxynil; Ioxynil lithium; Ioxynil sodium; Bromoxynil, chloroxynil (and their variants)
- Except where otherwise noted, data are given for materials in their standard state (at 25 °C [77 °F], 100 kPa). Infobox references

Ioxynil octanoate is a common chemical variant of the nitrile herbicide ioxynil, also called "ioxynil phenol". See ioxynil for information on ioxynil generally.

They have similar properties, and ioxynil octanoate is often sold labelled as "ioxynil, present as octanoate", and often as an emulsifiable concentrate to be diluted in water before spraying. The octanoate can be synthesised by esterifying ioxynil with octanoic acid.

Ioxynil octanoate is used in Australia. Its HRAC group is Group C (Australia), Group C3, (Global) and Group 6 (numeric).

Ioxynil was patented in 1963 and commercialised in 1966.

== Tradenames ==
Ioxynil octanoate has been sold as: Briotril, Oxytril, Stellox, Actril, Totril (Bayer) and Unynuox (AgNova).
