= Chloroxynil =

Names
- Preferred IUPAC name 3,5-dichloro-4-hydroxybenzonitrile

Identifiers
CAS Number	1891-95-8
3D model (JSmol)	Interactive image
ECHA InfoCard	100.015.976
EC Number	217-572-4
PubChem CID	74685
UNII	GI6X21WSVN
CompTox Dashboard (EPA)	DTXSID8022167
- InChI: InChI=1S/C7H3Cl2NO/c8-5-1-4(3-10)2-6(9)7(5)11/h1-2,11H Key: YRSSHOVRSMQULE-UHFFFAOYSA-N
- SMILES: C1=C(C=C(C(=C1Cl)O)Cl)C#N

Properties
Chemical formula	C_{7}H_{3}Cl_{2}NO
Molar mass	188.01 g·mol^{−1}
Appearance	Off-white solid
Melting point	140 °C (284 °F; 413 K)
Solubility in water	Slightly soluble

Hazards
- Occupational safety and health (OHS/OSH)
Main hazards	Toxic, harmful to aquatic life, irritant
- GHS labelling
Pictograms	(GHS06: Toxic)
Signal word	Danger
Hazard statements	H301, H311, H315, H319, H331, H335
- Lethal dose or concentration (LD, LC)
LD_{50} (median dose)	200 mg/kg (oral, rat)
LC_{50} (median concentration)	21.4-27.5mg/L (96h, Pimephales promelas)

Related compounds
Related compounds	Ioxynil, Bromoxynil, Bromoxynil octanoate
- Except where otherwise noted, data are given for materials in their standard state (at 25 °C [77 °F], 100 kPa). Infobox references

Chloroxynil is a postemergent benzonitrile herbicide, used to control broad leaved weeds on cereal crops. It was manufactured by Rhone-Poulenc and May & Baker, and is now considered obsolete, though its usage may continue.

Chloroxynil was developed as a variant of bromoxynil, which is identical except for bromines replacing chloroxynil's chlorines. A 1972 study found chloroxynil less injurious to alfalfa and red clover, but also less potent at controlling broadleaf weeds.

Chloroxynil's MoA inhibits electron transfer in the photosystem II receptor. Its HRAC group is Group C, (Australia) C3 (global) or 6 (numeric).

== Genetic engineering ==
Chloroxynil can greatly improve the speed and efficiency of agrobacterium-mediated transformation of plants. Compared to the control, acetosyringone was 6 times faster, and chloroxynil was 60 times faster. Chloroxynil's related herbicides were also tested: bromoxynil was 18 times faster than control but caused plant damage, and ioxynil showed no significant improvement.

== Soil behaviour ==
In soil, chloroxynil lasts about a month in aerobic soil (soil with sufficient oxygen to support microbial activity), or about two weeks in anaerobic soil. Sunlight can photochemically degrade it, by splitting off the chlorine atoms.

== Application ==
Chloroxynil was used on wheat, barley, oats, lucerne, sorghum and fax, to control pigweed, mayweed, knotweed, shepherd's purse, goosefoot and stinkweed.
