= Bromoxynil octanoate =

Herbicide, active ingredient

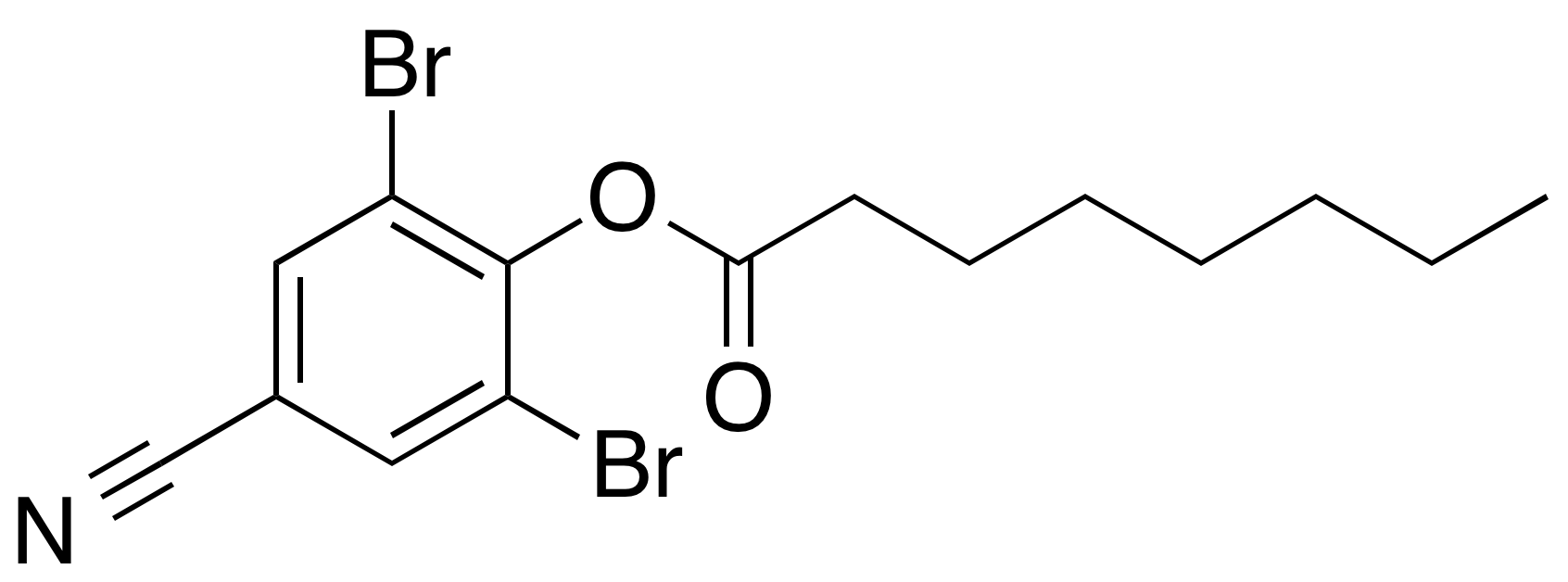

Names
- IUPAC name (2,6-Dibromo-4-cyanophenyl) octanoate
- Other names Bromoxynil octanoate

Identifiers
| CAS Number | 1689-99-2 |
| 3D model (JSmol) | Interactive image |
| ChEMBL | ChEMBL1903970 |
| ChemSpider | 14777 |
| ECHA InfoCard | 100.015.351 |
| EC Number | 216-885-3 |
| PubChem CID | 15533 |
| UNII | 9HL5XAW9SK |
| UN number | 2588 |
| CompTox Dashboard (EPA) | DTXSID7023932 |
- InChI: InChI=1S/C15H17Br2NO2/c1-2-3-4-5-6-7-14(19)20-15-12(16)8-11(10-18)9-13(15)17/h8-9H,2-7H2,1H3 Key: DQKWXTIYGWPGOO-UHFFFAOYSA-N
- SMILES: CCCCCCCC(=O)OC1=C(C=C(C=C1Br)C#N)Br

Properties
| Chemical formula | C_{15}H_{17}Br_{2}NO_{2} |
| Molar mass | 403.114 g·mol^{−1} |
| Appearance | creamy white solid |
| Melting point | 45–46 °C (113–115 °F; 318–319 K) |

Related compounds
| Related compounds | Bromoxynil, Ioxynil, Chloroxynil |
- Except where otherwise noted, data are given for materials in their standard state (at 25 °C [77 °F], 100 kPa). Infobox references

Bromoxynil octanoate is a herbicide active ingredient, closely related to bromoxynil, ioxynil, and ioxynil octanoate. Bromoxynil controls broad leafed weeds in many crops, and is used in the US, Europe and Australia, on crops, roadsides and turf.

Bromoxynil octanoate in the environment has a half-life of about 10 days, and breaks down into harmless compounds. It breaks down much quicker than bromoxynil, ioxynil or chloroxynil, which all last about a month in aerobic soil.

Bromoxynil octanoate acts by inhibiting photosynthesis at photosystem II, destroying cells, making it a Group C, (Aus), Group C3, (Global), or Group 6 (numeric) under the HRAC system. Weeds show symptoms after four to seven days of chlorotic leaves and desiccation.

It has been sold under the trademarks Bromoxynil, Broclean, Bromox, Brominex, Bromolex, Bromolex and Bromoxymobeed.

== Links ==
- Bromoxynil octanoate in the Pesticide Properties DataBase (PPDB)
