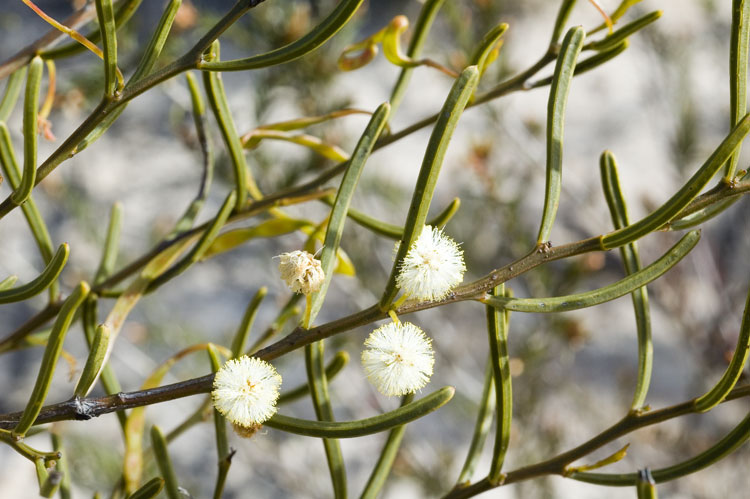

Scientific classification
- Kingdom: Plantae
- Clade: Tracheophytes
- Clade: Angiosperms
- Clade: Eudicots
- Clade: Rosids
- Order: Fabales
- Family: Fabaceae
- Subfamily: Caesalpinioideae
- Clade: Mimosoid clade
- Genus: Acacia
- Species: A. gonophylla

Binomial name
- Acacia gonophylla Benth.
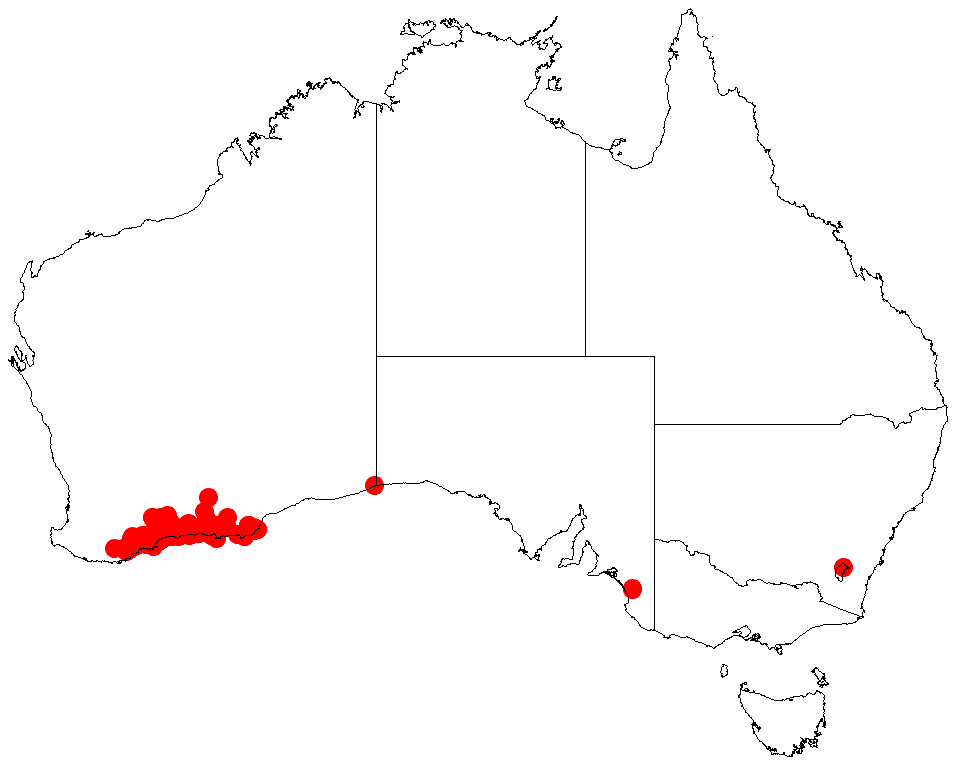
- Occurrence data from AVH

Synonyms
- Acacia gonophylla Benth. var. gonophylla; Racosperma gonophyllum (Benth.) Pedley

= Acacia gonophylla =

Rasp-stemmed wattle

Species of legume

Acacia gonophylla is a species of flowering plant in the family Fabaceae and is endemic to the south-west of Western Australia. It is a low, much-branched, spreading to erect shrub, with ascending to erect phyllodes with five raised veins, spherical heads of cream-coloured to pale yellow flowers, and linear, thinly leathery pods.

== Description ==
Acacia gonophylla is a low, much-branched, spreading to erect shrub that typically grows to a height of 0.4–1 m (1 ft 4 in – 3 ft 3 in), and has glabrous, ribbed branchlets. Its phyllodes are ascending to erect, pentagonous in cross-section with five prominently raised veins with hollows between them, 20–45 mm (0.79–1.77 in) long and usually 1.0–1.5 mm (0.039–0.059 in) wide. The phyllodes are glabrous, have an often coarsely pointed tip, and a gland 3–7 mm (0.12–0.28 in) above the base. The flowers are borne in up to three spherical heads in racemes in axils on a glabrous peduncle 4–8 mm (0.16–0.31 in) long, each head 4.5–5.0 mm (0.18–0.20 in) in diameter with 12 to 21 cream-coloured to pale yellow flowers. Flowering occurs from May to October, and the pods are linear, up to 80 mm (3.1 in) long and 3–4 mm (0.12–0.16 in) wide, thinly leathery, glabrous, dark red-brown and rounded over the seeds. The seeds are oblong to elliptic, 3–4 mm (0.12–0.16 in) long, and shiny black with a thick aril.

== Taxonomy ==
Acacia gonophylla was first formally described in 1855 by the botanist George Bentham in Linnaea: ein Journal für die Botanik in ihrem ganzen Umfange, oder Beiträge zur Pflanzenkunde, from a specimen collected by James Drummond between the Swan River Colony and Cape Riche. The specific epithet (gonophylla) means 'angle-leaved'.

== Distribution and habitat ==
This species of wattle grows in sand, lateritic gravel or granite clay in heath, mallee scrub and woodland from near the Stirling Range to Israelite Bay in the Esperance Plains, Hampton and Mallee bioregions of south-western Western Australia.

== Conservation status ==
Acacia gonophylla is listed as "not threatened" by the Government of Western Australia Department of Biodiversity, Conservation and Attractions.

== See also ==
- List of Acacia species
