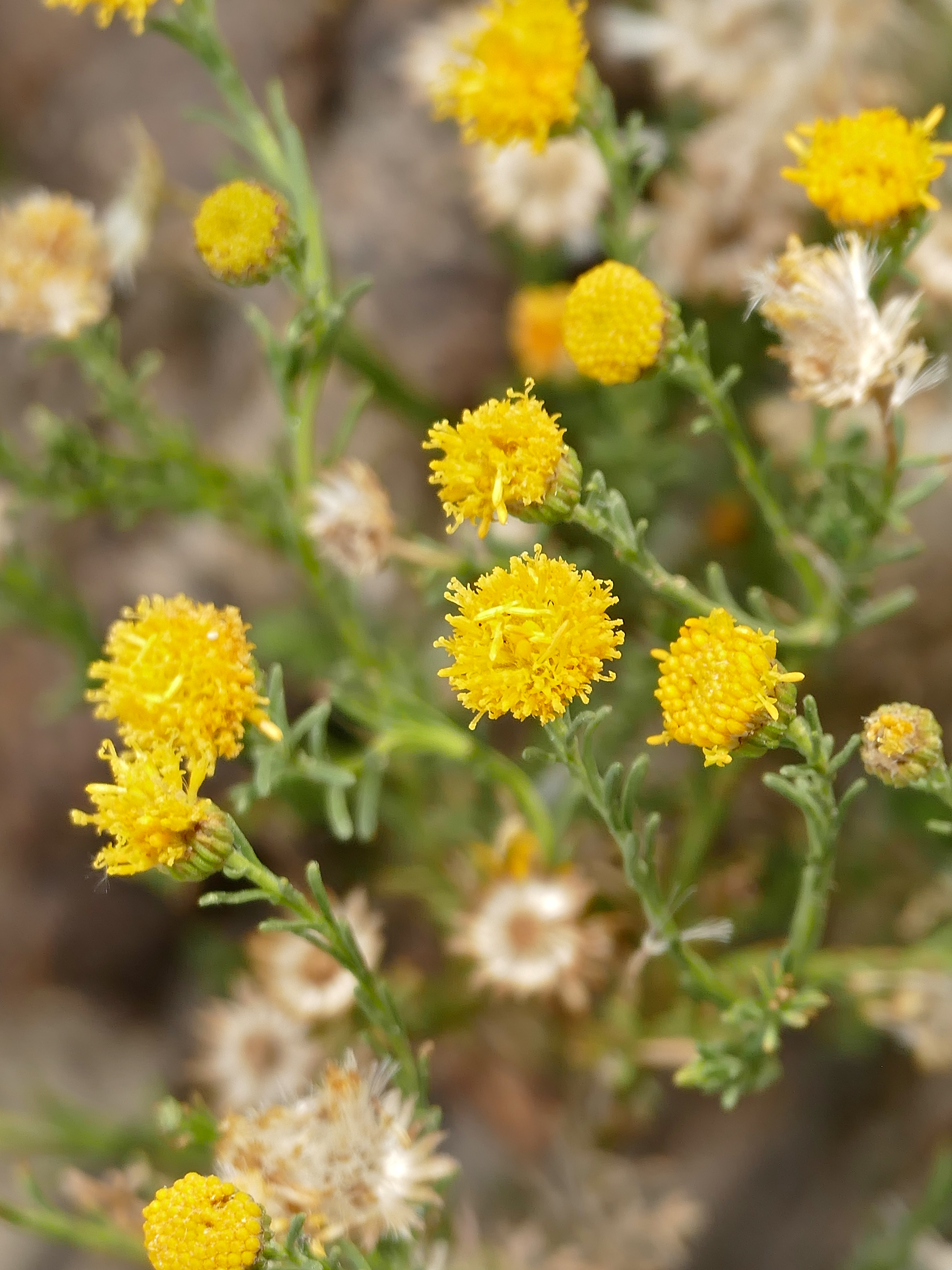
- Pentzia incana

Scientific classification
- Kingdom: Plantae
- Clade: Tracheophytes
- Clade: Angiosperms
- Clade: Eudicots
- Clade: Asterids
- Order: Asterales
- Family: Asteraceae
- Subfamily: Asteroideae
- Tribe: Anthemideae
- Genus: Pentzia; Thunb.

Type species
- Pentzia crenata Thunb.

Synonyms
- Asteringa E.Mey. ex DC.; Rennera Merxm.

= Pentzia =

Genus of flowering plants

Pentzia is a genus of flowering plants in the chamomile tribe within the sunflower family. Species are native to southern Africa, Chad, northwestern Africa, Somalia, and the southern Arabian Peninsula. One species (P. incana) is naturalized in Australia and in the southwestern United States.

The genus is named for Swedish plant collector Hendrik Christian Pentz (1738–1803).

== Species ==
31 species are accepted.

- Pentzia arabica Thulin
- Pentzia argentea Hutch.
- Pentzia bolusii Hutch.
- Pentzia calcarea Kies
- Pentzia calva S.Moore
- Pentzia cooperi Harv.
- Pentzia dentata (L.) Kuntze
- Pentzia eenii S.Moore
- Pentzia elegans DC.
- Pentzia globosa Less.
- Pentzia hesperidum Maire & Wilczek
- Pentzia incana (Thunb.) Kuntze
- Pentzia lanata Hutch.
- Pentzia laxa Bremek. & Oberm.
- Pentzia limnophila (Merxm.) Magee
- Pentzia monocephala S.Moore
- Pentzia monodiana Maire
- Pentzia nana Burch.
- Pentzia oppositifolia Magee
- Pentzia peduncularis B.Nord.
- Pentzia pinnatisecta Hutch.
- Pentzia punctata Harv.
- Pentzia quinquefida (Thunb.) Less.
- Pentzia somalensis E.A.Bruce ex Thulin
- Pentzia sphaerocephala DC.
- Pentzia spinescens Less.
- Pentzia stellata (P.P.J.Herman) Magee
- Pentzia tomentosa B.Nord.
- Pentzia tortuosa (DC.) Fenzl ex Harv.
- Pentzia trifida Schltr. ex Magee & J.C.Manning
- Pentzia viridis Kies

=== Formerly included ===
Several species once considered part of Pentzia now regarded as better suited to other genera, including Foveolina Gymnopentzia Inulanthera Myxopappus Oncosiphon, and Phymaspermum.
