= Stinkweed =

Stinkweed is a common name for several noxiously scented plants, and may refer to:

- Ailanthus altissima (stinkweed tree)
- Artemisia tilesii, known as stinkweed in Alaska
- Cleomella
- Conium maculatum (hemlock) local name in the United States
- Datura stramonium (jimson weed)
- Diplotaxis muralis, known as stinkweed in the United Kingdom
- Thlaspi arvense (field pennycress)
- Cannabis indica (Indian hemp)
- Oncosiphon pilulifer (Stinknet, globe chamomile)
