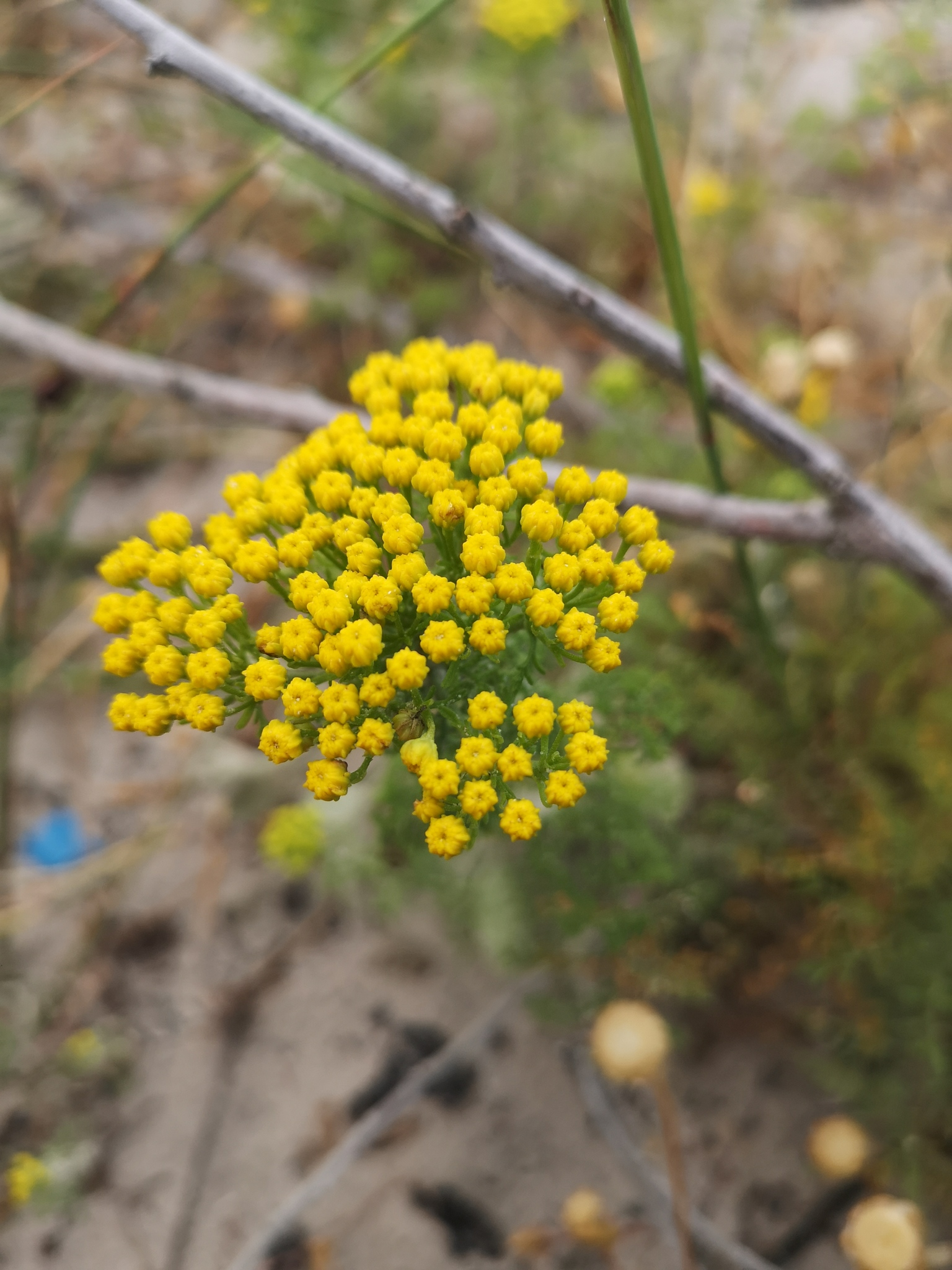
- yellow flowers

Scientific classification
- Kingdom: Plantae
- Clade: Embryophytes
- Clade: Tracheophytes
- Clade: Spermatophytes
- Clade: Angiosperms
- Clade: Eudicots
- Clade: Asterids
- Order: Asterales
- Family: Asteraceae
- Genus: Oncosiphon
- Species: O. suffruticosus

Binomial name
- Oncosiphon suffruticosus (L.) Källersjö

Synonyms
- Oncosiphon suffruticosum orth var.; Cotula tanacetifolia L.; Matricaria multiflora Fenzl ex. Harv.; Pentzia suffruticosa (L.) Hutch. ex. Merxm.

= Oncosiphon suffruticosus =

Species of plant

Onocosiphon suffruticosus (often spelled suffruticosum), commonly known as the shrubby mayweed, is a flowering plant native to Namibia and the Western Cape and Northern Cape provinces of South Africa. Additionally, it can now be found in France, Australia, and the US.

== Description ==
Shrubby mayweed is an annual plant, flowering from September to December in barren, sandy soils, such as the shores of salt marshes. The bisexual flowers consists of many yellow buttons around 5 mm (0.20 in) in diameter composed only of disc florets, with a corymb inflorescence that can grow to be up to 30 cm (12 in) wide. It grows knee-high (around 50 cm tall) and has feathery gray-green leaves that have pinnatisect and glabrous morphology and an irritating smell.

It produces fruits that are brown in color with white tufts of hairs that help in wind dispersal. The seeds are wind dispersed after production from October to January. Unlike some of it relatives (Foveolina and Pentzia) its fruits do not contain myxogenic cells so when they contact water they cannot take it in to store for germination.

== Etymology ==
The Greek oncos, which describes large or round size due to accumulation of fluid is the root for the name Oncosiphon and the other portion of the word siphon describes a hollow cylindrical shape. Together these give reference to the shape and size of the corolla—or fused petals—of this plants disk florets. The somewhat shrublike quality of this plant gives rise to the name suffruticosum, which can be broken down into the Latin terms suf and fructicosum whose definitions refer to this shrub-like quality.

It may also be known scientifically as Matricaria suffruticosa.

Onocosiphon suffruticosus has a variety of common names depending on where you are located. In Africa it can be called stinkkruid, wurmkruid, wurmbos, or miskruid; in Australia it is Calomba daisy after the place in Australia it was originally found; in the US they know it as shrubby mayweed; in England it is called stinkingweed.

== Agriculture ==
In South Africa, it is a weed that can seriously challenge crops, due to its strong smell that repels most livestock and adversely affects the taste of milk and meat from animals that do consume it. It only propagates by direct seeding and therefore spreads slowly.

Currently, this plant is not used agriculturally but due to its widespread uses in medicine it has the potential to be a seasonal crop in South Africa.

== Uses ==
Traditional uses

Historically this plant has been used in traditional Khoi-San and Cape Dutch herbal medicine for a variety of ailments. The ailments treated with this plant include general health issues treated by using the plant as a tonic, a digestive, a anthelmintic, and a diuretic. Additionally, it is also used for more specific health issues and illnesses including infantile convulsions, stomach pain, typhoid fever, rheumatic fever, and influenza. Juice from the leaves can be mixed with breastmilk for cramps and gas build up in infants. Lastly, it can be used as a poultice for scorpion stings.

Essential oil

More recently, research has been completed on the essential oil of Oncosiphon suffruticosum (L.) Källersjö. The findings of this study highlight the potential of this essential oil as a cosmeseutical. Specifically, the essential oil offers sun protection (SPF) making it a potential option for sunscreen. However, these findings are new and in-vitro so more research is required until this comes into practice.

== Growing ==
For best growth, shrubby mayweed seeds should be planted in March (or autumn) when planting in the Southern Hemisphere (where this plant is typically grown). Ideally, this plant should be grown in a sunny area and in large amounts alongside other species that flower at the same time to aid fill it out.

== Conservation ==
The species is listed on the SANBI Red List with a status of "Least Concern".

In Australia, it is considered an invasive species and considered a weed in the US.
