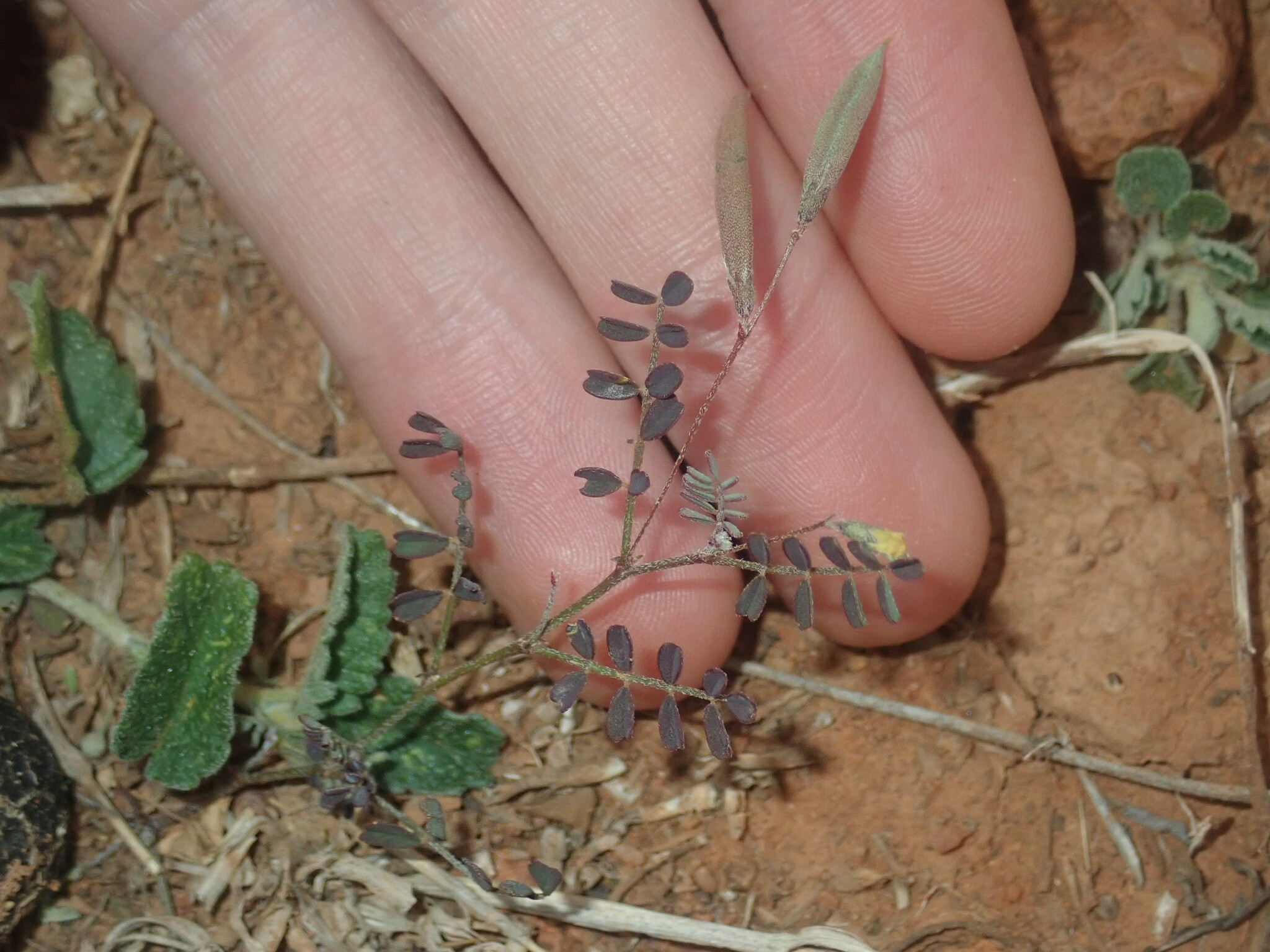

Scientific classification
- Kingdom: Plantae
- Clade: Tracheophytes
- Clade: Angiosperms
- Clade: Eudicots
- Clade: Rosids
- Order: Fabales
- Family: Fabaceae
- Subfamily: Faboideae
- Genus: Swainsona
- Species: S. oliveri

Binomial name
- Swainsona oliveri F.Muell.

Synonyms
- Swainsona oliverii F.Muell. orth.var.

= Swainsona oliveri =

Species of legume

Swainsona oliveri is a species of flowering plant in the family Fabaceae and is endemic to south-western Australia. It is a slender, prostrate to ascending annual or perennial herb with imparipinnate leaves with 9 to 13 narrowly egg-shaped leaflets, the narrower end towards the base, and racemes of up to 4 cream-coloured to yellow flowers, sometimes with a pink tinge.

== Description ==
Swainsona oliveri is a slender prostrate to ascending annual or perennial herb, that typically grows to a height of about 2–15 cm (0.79–5.91 in) and has radiating stems. The leaves are imparipinnate, mostly 150–350 mm (5.9–13.8 in) long with 9 to 13 egg-shaped leaflets with the narrower end towards the base, the side leaflets 1–7 mm (0.039–0.276 in) long and 1–3 mm (0.039–0.118 in) wide with stipules 1–2 mm (0.039–0.079 in) long at the base of the petioles. The flowers are cream-coloured to yellow, sometimes tinged with pink, arranged in racemes of up to 4 on a peduncle up to 40 mm (1.6 in) long. The sepals are joined at the base to form a tube about 3 mm (0.12 in) long, with lobes shorter than the tube. The standard petal is 3.5–6 mm (0.14–0.24 in) long and 3–5 mm (0.12–0.20 in) wide, the wings 3–6 mm (0.12–0.24 in) long and the keel about 4–6 mm (0.16–0.24 in) long and 1–2 mm (0.039–0.079 in) deep. Flowering occurs from August to September, and the fruit is a narrowly elliptical pod 10–25 mm (0.39–0.98 in) long and 3.5–4 mm (0.14–0.16 in) wide with the remains of the style 1.0–1.25 mm (0.039–0.049 in) long.

== Taxonomy and naming ==
Swainsona oliveri was first formally described in 1882 by Ferdinand von Mueller in Southern Science Record from a specimens collected near Port Eucla by John Oliver. The specific epithet (oliveri) honours the collector of the type specimens.

== Distribution ==
This species of swainsona grows on sandy plains and is widespread in South Australia and in the Avon Wheatbelt, Coolgardie, Great Victoria Desert, Hampton, Murchison and Nullarbor bioregions of Western Australia. It also occurs in the far western plains of New South Wales and the south of the Northern Territory.
