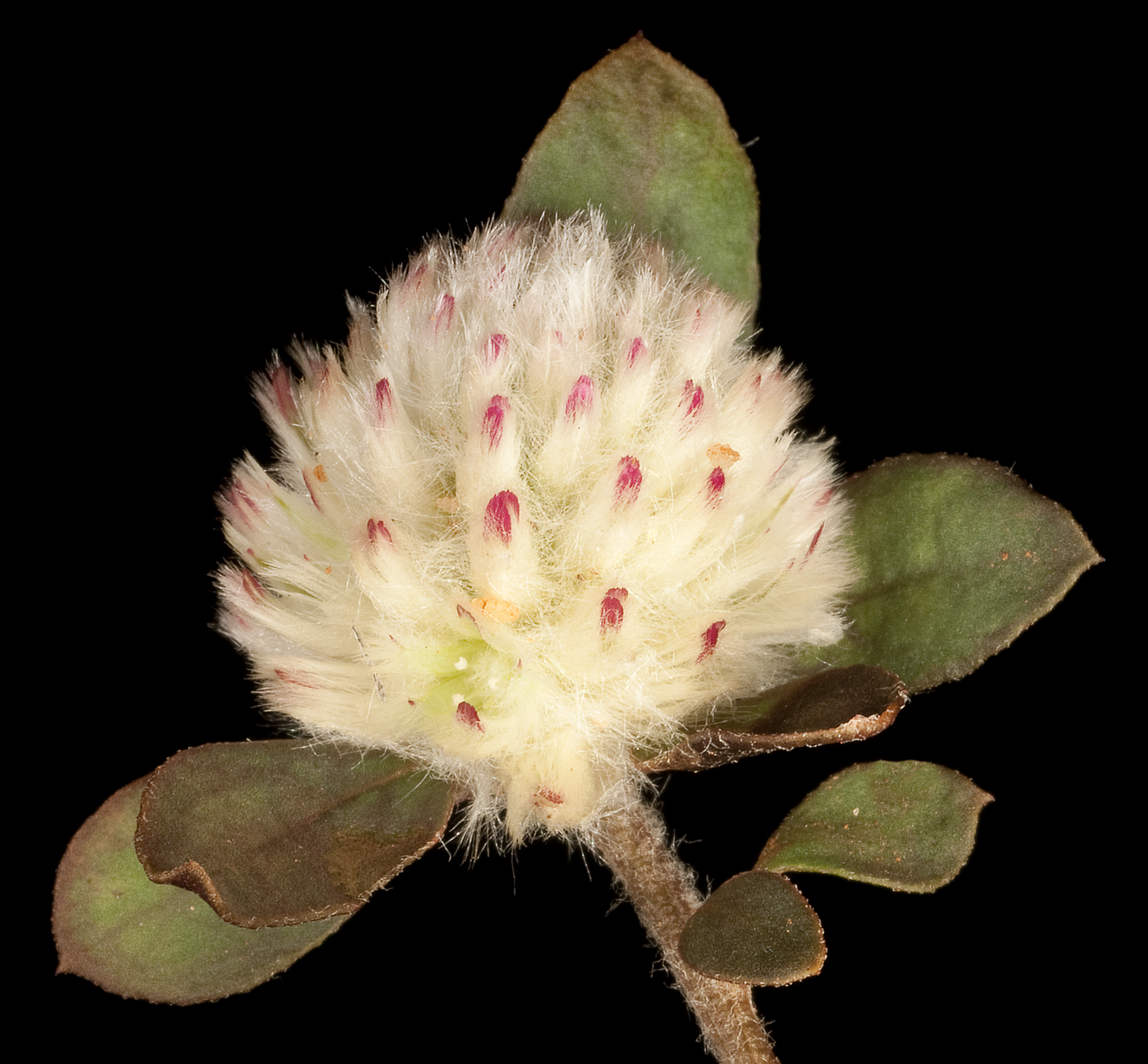

Scientific classification
- Kingdom: Plantae
- Clade: Tracheophytes
- Clade: Angiosperms
- Clade: Eudicots
- Order: Caryophyllales
- Family: Amaranthaceae
- Genus: Ptilotus
- Species: P. holosericeus

Binomial name
- Ptilotus holosericeus (Moq.) F.Muell.

Synonyms
- Ptilotus sp. Jaurdi (L.W.Sage 1733) WA Herbarium; Trichinium holosericeum Moq.

= Ptilotus holosericeus =

Species of grass-like plant

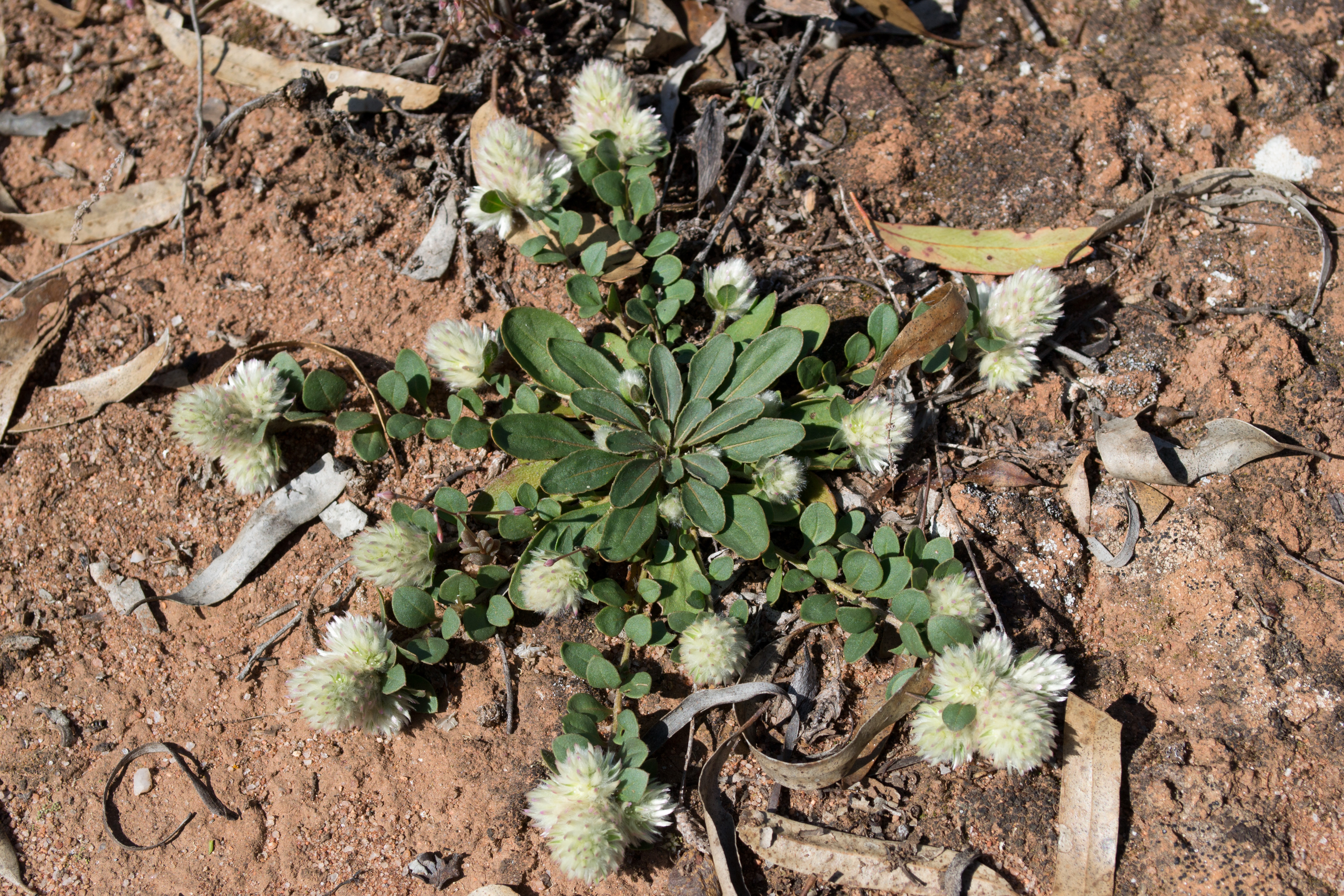
Habit near Goomalling

Ptilotus holosericeus is a species of flowering plant in the family Amaranthaceae and is endemic to the south-west of Western Australia. It is a prostrate to low-lying perennial herb with several stems, oblong to spatula-shaped leaves and oval or cylindrical spikes of green, white or pink flowers.

== Description ==
Ptilotus holosericeus is a prostrate to low-lying perennial herb, that typically grows to a height of up to 10 cm (3.9 in), its stems and leaves covered with soft hairs, later glabrous. Its leaves are oblong to spatula-shaped, mostly 8–70 mm (0.31–2.76 in) long and 3–22 mm (0.12–0.87 in) wide. The flowers are arranged in oval or cylindrical spikes with colourless, hairy bracts 4.7–7.4 mm (0.19–0.29 in) long and similar bracteoles 5.5–6 mm (0.22–0.24 in) long. The outer tepals are 6.2–8.2 mm (0.24–0.32 in) long and the inner tepals 5.2–7.7 mm (0.20–0.30 in) long. The style is 1.4–2.2 mm (0.055–0.087 in) long, sometimes curved, fixed to the side of the ovary. Flowering occurs from September to December.

== Taxonomy ==
This species was first formally described in 1849 by Alfred Moquin-Tandon who gave it the name Trichinium holosericeum in de Candolle's Prodromus Systematis Naturalis Regni Vegetabilis, from specimens collected near the Swan River by James Drummond. In 1868, Ferdinand von Mueller transferred the species to Ptilotus as P. holosericeus in his Fragmenta Phytographiae Australiae. The specific epithet (holosericeus) means 'entirely silky'.

== Distribution and habitat ==
Ptilotus holosericeus grows in clay to sandy-clay in open woodland in the Avon Wheatbelt, Coolgardie, Esperance Plains, Hampton, Mallee, Murchison, Nullarbor and Yalgoo bioregions of south-western Western Australia.

== See also ==
- List of Ptilotus species
