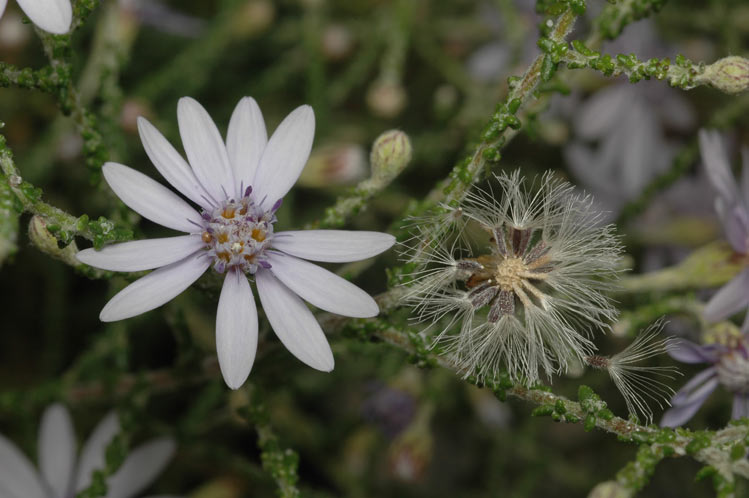
- In Australian National Botanic Gardens

Scientific classification
- Kingdom: Plantae
- Clade: Tracheophytes
- Clade: Angiosperms
- Clade: Eudicots
- Clade: Asterids
- Order: Asterales
- Family: Asteraceae
- Genus: Olearia
- Species: O. ramosissima

Binomial name
- Olearia ramosissima (DC.) Benth.

Synonyms
- Eurybia ramosissima DC.; Shawia ramosissima (DC.) Sch.Bip.

= Olearia ramosissima =

Species of plant

Olearia ramosissima, commonly known as much-branched daisy bush, is a species of flowering plant in the family Asteraceae and is endemic to continental Australia. It is a straggly shrub with densely-crowded, elliptic, egg-shaped or triangular leaves, and blue to violet and blue or yellow, daisy-like inflorescences.

== Description ==
Olearia ramosissima is a straggly shrub that typically grows to a height of up to about 1.3 m (4 ft 3 in). Its leaves are arranged alternately along the branches, but densely-crowded, elliptic, triangular or egg-shaped with the narrower end towards the base, 0.5–5 mm (0.020–0.197 in) long, 0.3–2 mm (0.012–0.079 in) wide with the edges rolled under. The upper surface of the leaves is minutely pimply, the lower surface covered with greyish, woolly hairs. The heads or daisy-like "flowers" are usually arranged singly on the ends of branches and are sessile, 22–27 mm (0.87–1.06 in) in diameter with 8 to 13 blue to violet ray florets, surrounding 11 to 15 blue or yellow disc florets. Flowering occurs from June to August and the fruit is a silky-hairy achene, the pappus with 27 to 47 bristles.

== Taxonomy ==
This daisy was first formally described in 1836 by Augustin Pyramus de Candolle who gave it the name Eurybia ramosissima in his Prodromus Systematis Naturalis Regni Vegetabilis. In 1867, George Bentham changed the name to Olearia ramosissima in Flora Australiensis. The specific epithet (ramosissima) means "much-branched".

== Distribution and habitat ==
Much-branched daisy bush has a disjunct distribution, occurring in the south-west of Western Australia, and in south-east Queensland and northern New South Wales in eastern Australia. In eastern Australia it grows in forest, mainly on the slopes and tablelands north from Narrabri. In Western Australia it grows on undulating plains on clay flats in the Coolgardie, Esperance Plains, Hampton and Mallee bioregions in the south of that state.
