= Pentzia tomentosa =

Conservation status
- Least Concern (IUCN 3.1)

Scientific classification
- Kingdom: Plantae
- Clade: Tracheophytes
- Clade: Angiosperms
- Clade: Eudicots
- Clade: Asterids
- Order: Asterales
- Family: Asteraceae
- Genus: Pentzia
- Species: P. tomentosa

Binomial name
- Pentzia tomentosa B.Nord.

Species of flowering plant

Pentzia tomentosa is a species of flowering plant in the aster family. It is endemic to Namibia. Its natural habitat is rocky areas.
