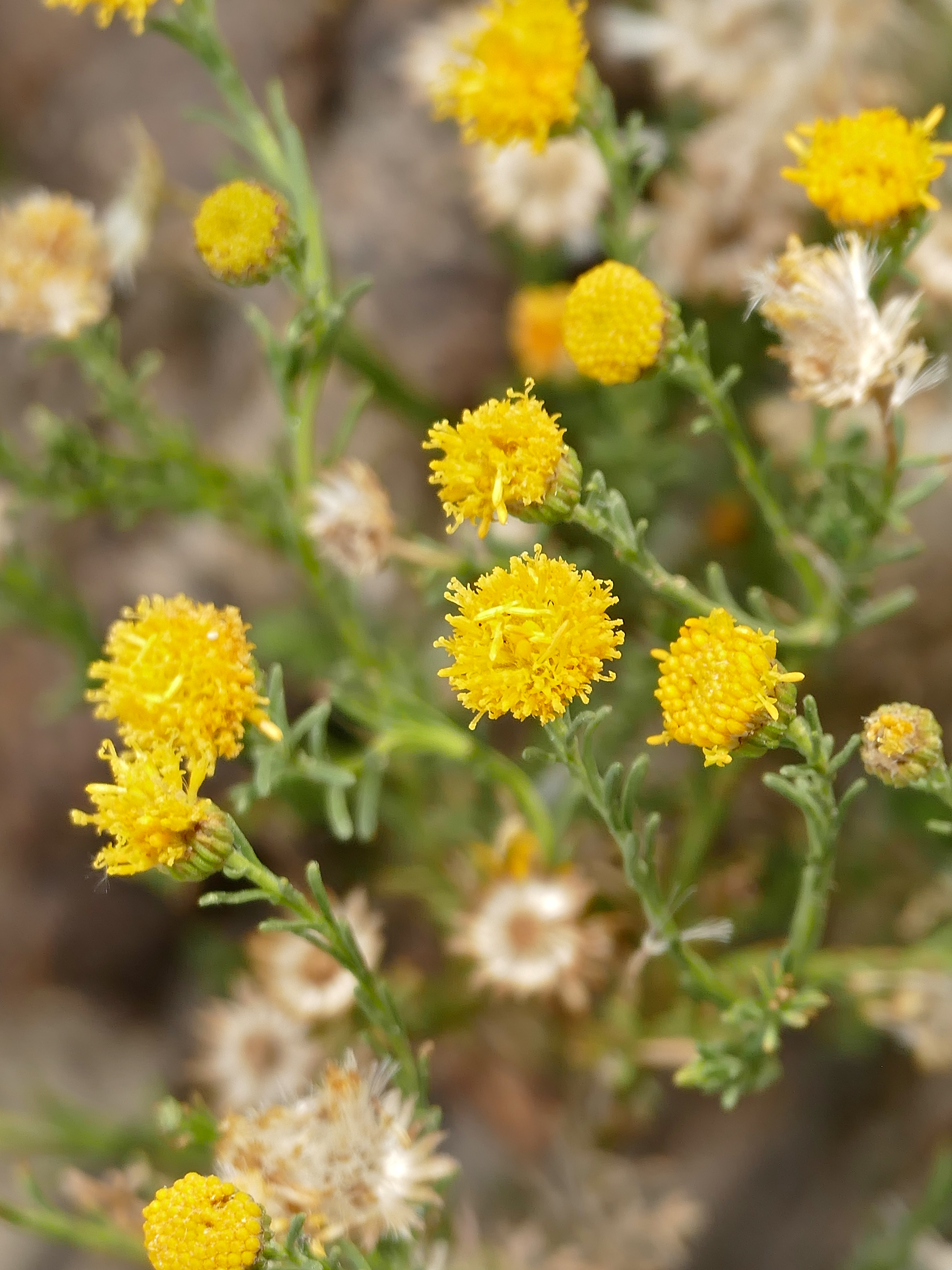

Scientific classification
- Kingdom: Plantae
- Clade: Embryophytes
- Clade: Tracheophytes
- Clade: Spermatophytes
- Clade: Angiosperms
- Clade: Eudicots
- Clade: Asterids
- Order: Asterales
- Family: Asteraceae
- Genus: Pentzia
- Species: P. incana

Binomial name
- Pentzia incana (Thunb.) Kuntze

= Pentzia incana =

African sheepbush

Species of plant

The African sheepbush (Afrikaans: goeiekaroo, "good karoo", Pentzia incana) is a plant native to South Africa and Namibia. It ranges throughout the Succulent Karoo, Nama Karoo, renosterveld, and fynbos, and it is listed under the SANBI Red List as "safe" (LC).

The African sheepbush has been imported to Australia.

The grey, downy shrub grows to around 60 cm (24 in) in height, with fibrous stem branches that rise, bundled 3-9 mm leaves of egg or wedge shape split one or two ways, and yellow flowers resembling chamomile.
