= Mayweed =

Mayweed is a common name for two different species of flowering plants and also a name commonly used for several genera of the tribe Anthemideae whose species are currently in a flux of renaming:

Species with the common name of mayweed:

Anthemis cotula
Anthemis arvensis
Oncosiphon suffruticosus

Genera commonly called mayweed:

Matricaria
Tripleurospermum
