= Solanum triflorum =

Scientific classification
- Kingdom: Plantae
- Clade: Tracheophytes
- Clade: Angiosperms
- Clade: Eudicots
- Clade: Asterids
- Order: Solanales
- Family: Solanaceae
- Genus: Solanum
- Species: S. triflorum

Binomial name
- Solanum triflorum Nutt.

Species of flowering plant

Solanum triflorum is a species of nightshade, in the family Solanaceae, also known as cutleaf nightshade and small nightshade. Like many nightshades, S. triflorum is native to South America, specifically to Argentina; it has made its way onto other continents, including Europe and Australia, as an introduced species, where it is deemed a weed, at times. It is also typically considered native to much of the Eastern and Western parts of the United states and parts of Canada, although there is some debate on the matter.

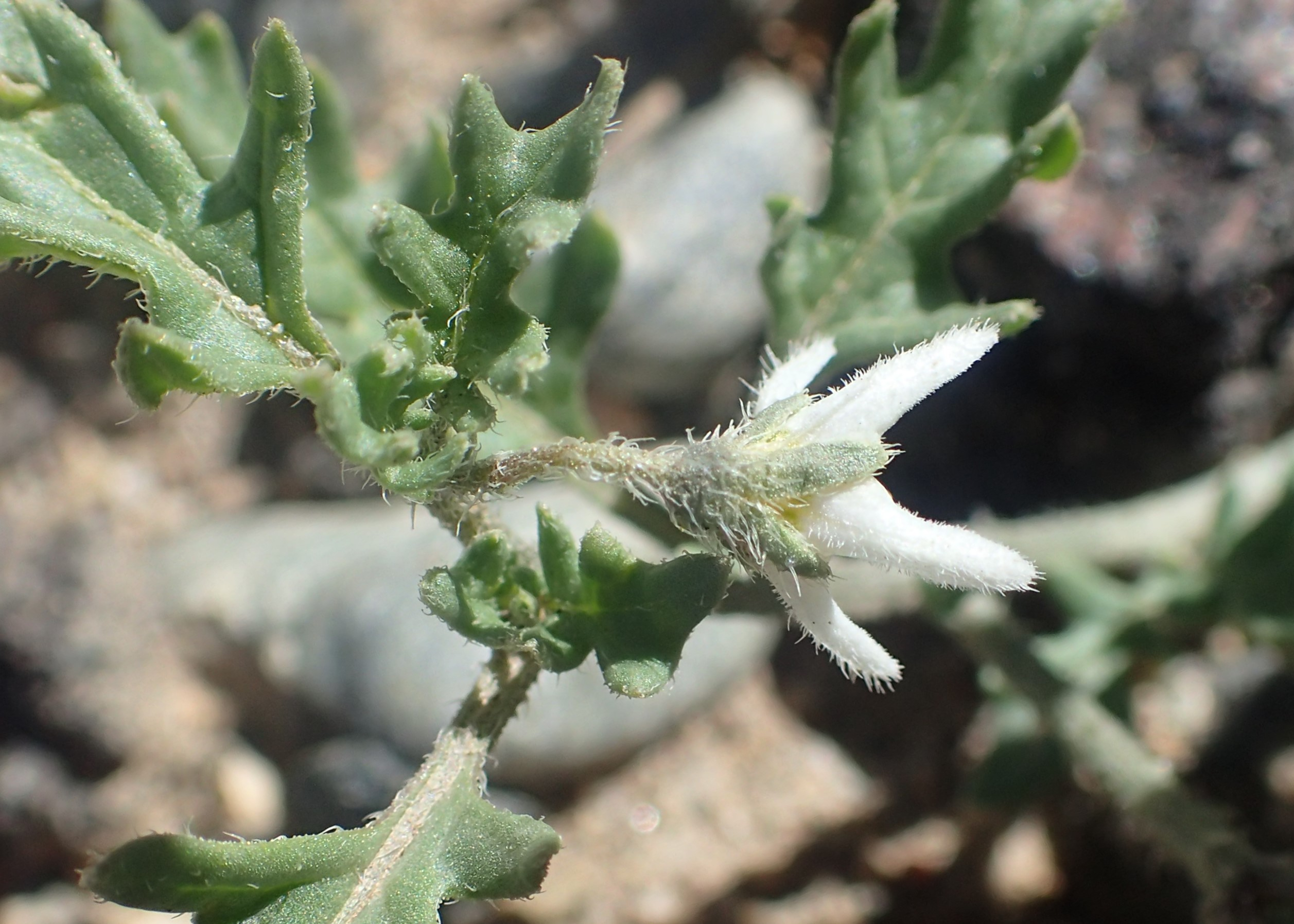
A photo of Solanum triflorum taken at Williams Fork Reservoir, Colorado, USA.

== Description ==
It grows in many types of habitats, preferring tilled, disturbed terrain for germinating. It is an annual herb, producing sprawling, decumbent stems dotted with new growth. These decumbent, horizontal stems may quickly grow up to a meter in all directions. Solanum triflorum is covered in trichomes and hairs, which are sometimes mistaken for glands. The leaves are a few centimeters long, and deeply “cut” into slightly pointed, serrated lobes, giving its common name, “cutleaf”. The inflorescence bears two or three flowers, each just under a centimeter wide when fully open. The flower is usually white, but may be greenish or purple-tinged. The fruit is a berry roughly a centimeter wide.

== Toxicity ==
Solanum triflorum has been shown to be toxic to most animals, and the alkaloids present in the genus Solanum are suspected to be the root cause of toxic effects in rodents that consume them.
