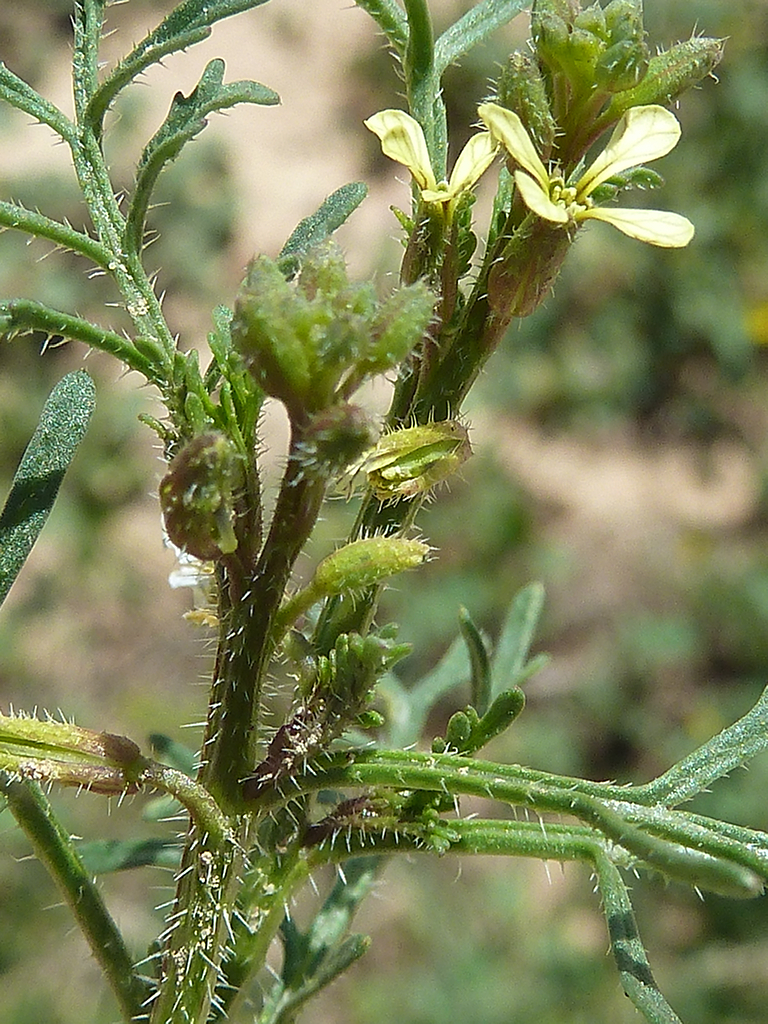

Scientific classification
- Kingdom: Plantae
- Clade: Tracheophytes
- Clade: Angiosperms
- Clade: Eudicots
- Clade: Rosids
- Order: Brassicales
- Family: Brassicaceae
- Genus: Carrichtera; DC.
- Species: C. annua

Binomial name
- Carrichtera annua (L.) DC.

= Carrichtera =

Genus of flowering plants

Carrichtera is a genus of flowering plants belonging to the family Brassicaceae.

It has a single species, Carrichtera annua, commonly known as Ward's weed. Its native range is from Macaronesia across North Africa and Western Asia to Iran and Saudi Arabia, and in Portugal and Greece in southern Europe.

It has been introduced to Italy, Japan, Australia, New Zealand, and California, where it is considered invasive.
