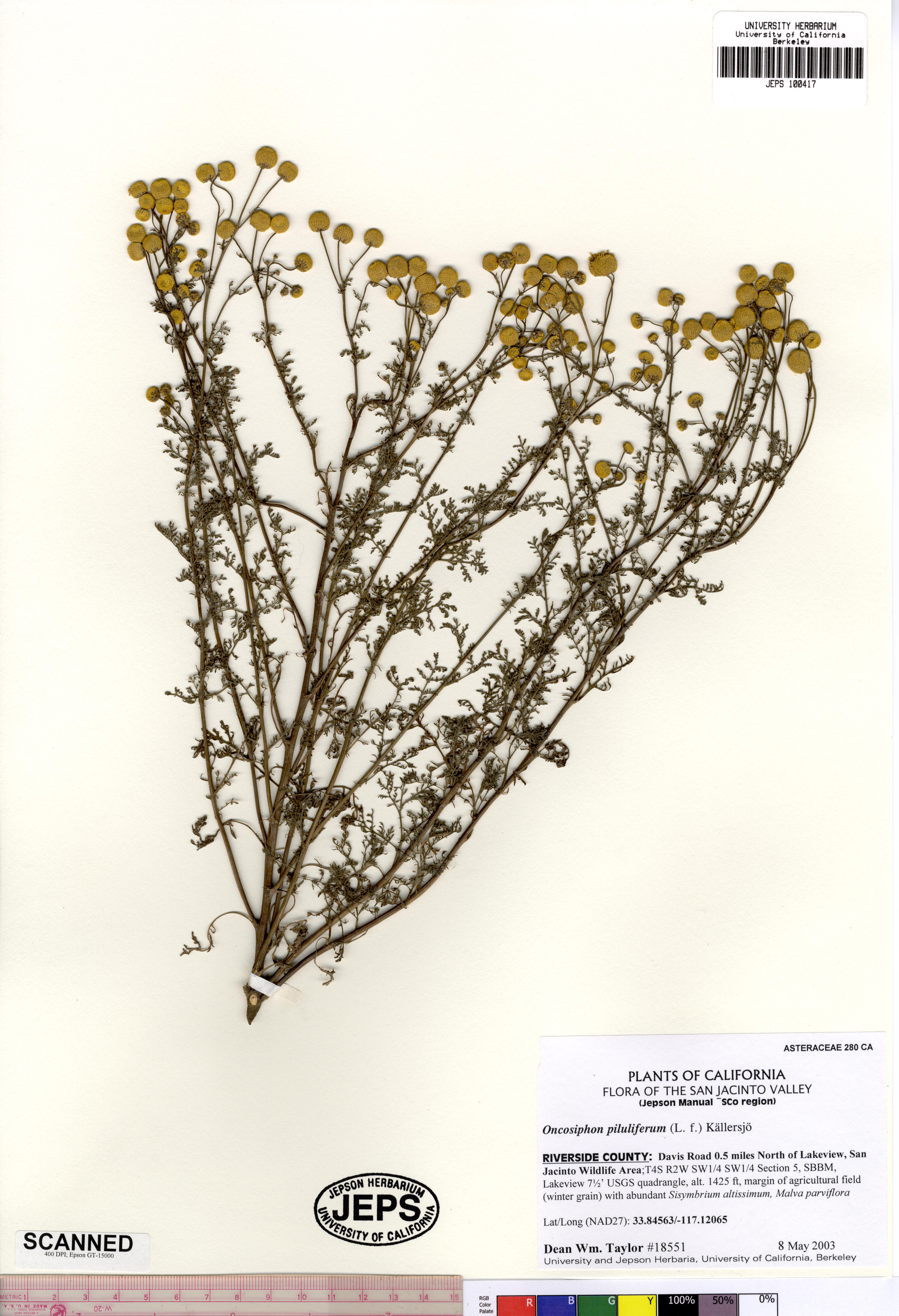
- Oncosiphon pilulifer

Scientific classification
- Kingdom: Plantae
- Clade: Embryophytes
- Clade: Tracheophytes
- Clade: Spermatophytes
- Clade: Angiosperms
- Clade: Eudicots
- Clade: Asterids
- Order: Asterales
- Family: Asteraceae
- Subfamily: Asteroideae
- Tribe: Anthemideae
- Genus: Oncosiphon; Källersjö

Type species
- Oncosiphon pilulifer (L.f.) Källersjö

= Oncosiphon =

Genus of plants

Oncosiphon is a small genus of flowering plants in the daisy family (Asteraceae). All known species are native to southern Africa.

== Species ==
As of 2020, the following species are listed in Kew's Plants of the World Online:

- Oncosiphon africanus (P.J.Bergius) Källersjö
- Oncosiphon glabratus (Thunb.) Källersjö
- Oncosiphon grandiflorus (Thunb.) Källersjö
- Oncosiphon intermedius (Hutch.) Källersjö
- Oncosiphon pilulifer (L.f.) Källersjö
- Oncosiphon sabulosus (Wolley-Dod) Källersjö
- Oncosiphon schlechteri (Bolus ex Schltr.) Källersjö
- Oncosiphon suffruticosus (L.) Källersjö
