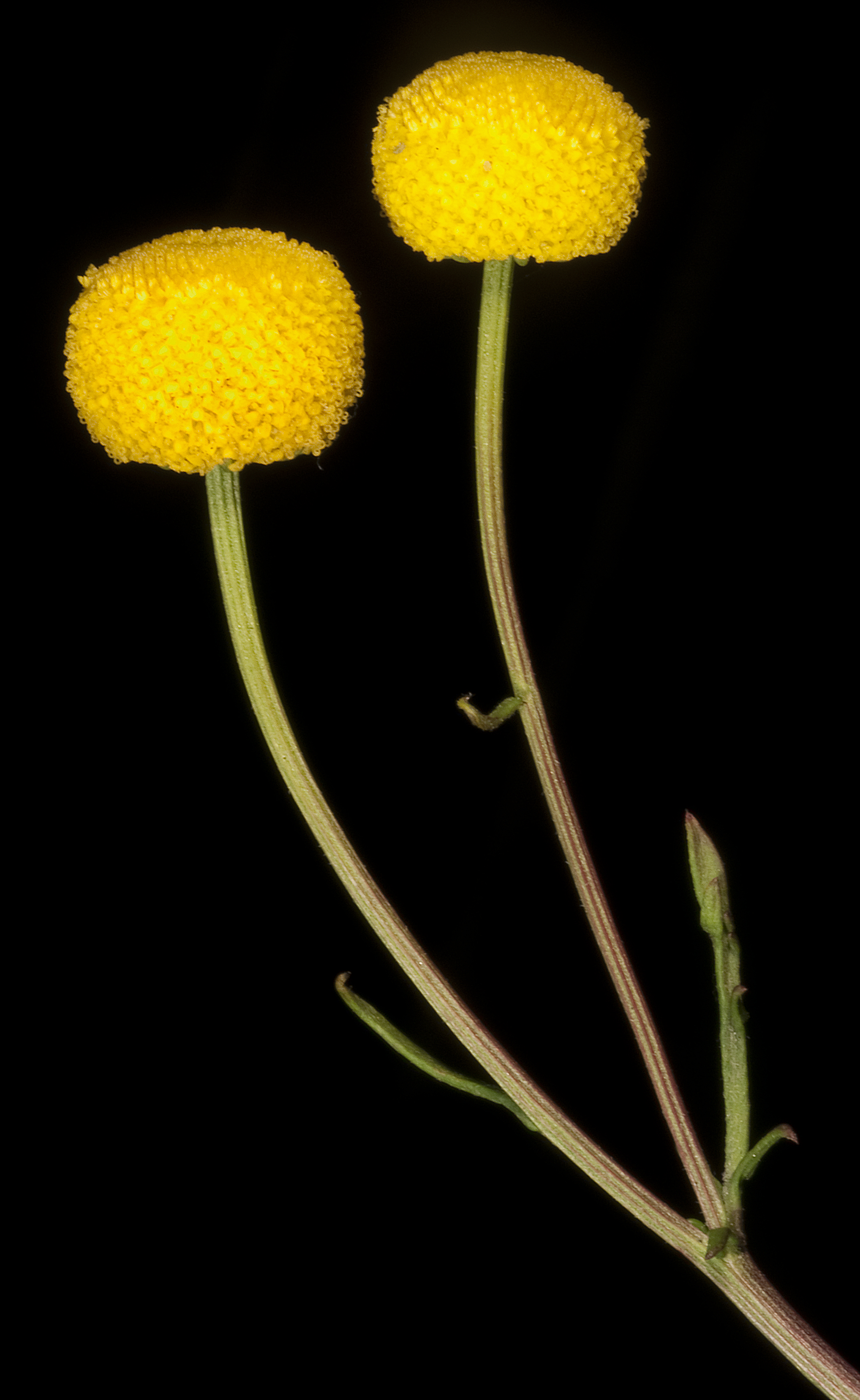

Scientific classification
- Kingdom: Plantae
- Clade: Tracheophytes
- Clade: Angiosperms
- Clade: Eudicots
- Clade: Asterids
- Order: Asterales
- Family: Asteraceae
- Genus: Oncosiphon
- Species: O. pilulifer

Binomial name
- Oncosiphon pilulifer (L.f.) Källersjö

Synonyms
- Cenocline globifera K.Koch; Chrysanthemum obtusum Kuntze; Cotula globifera Thunb.; Cotula pilulifera L.f.; Matricaria globifera Fenzl ex Harv.; Matricaria pilulifera Druce; Pentzia globifera Hutch.; Pentzia pilulifera (L.f.) Fourc.; Tanacetum globiferum DC.; Tanacetum obtusum Thunb.

= Oncosiphon pilulifer =

Species of plant native to Africa

Oncosiphon pilulifer, also known as globe chamomile and stinknet, is a flowering plant in the daisy family (Asteraceae) native to South Africa and Lesotho. It is considered invasive in some parts of North America.

== Other names ==
Synonyms include Matricaria globifera because it was previously in the Matricaria genus, and Pentzia globifera, named for 18th century Swedish botanist Carolus Johannes Pentz.

The common name "stinknet" reflects the plant's strong odor.

== Description ==
Globe chamomile is a straggly, branching annual plant with a strong smell, growing up to 2 ft (60 cm) tall. The bipinnate or tripinnate leaves have a fleshy midrib which widens at the base. The globular flowers are borne in paniculate flower heads. There are no ray florets and the disc florets are yellow.

== Ecology ==
Globe chamomile is native to South Africa and Lesotho. It is also found in the Australian states of Victoria and Western Australia.

In North America, globe chamomile grows from seed in November to January when it begins flowering and setting new seeds. With sufficient moisture, three generations can grow by April. Wind-borne seed transportation spreads the plant which takes root in sunny, disturbed soil in natural and cultivated areas. Plants can cause skin irritation or allergic reaction through contact with the plant or inhalation of its pollen.

A single plant can contain up to 4000 flower balls, each ball being made up of hundreds of flowers.

== Invasiveness in the United States ==
Globe chamomile is considered invasive in the United States in California and Arizona. First seen in Los Angeles and San Diego in the early 1980s, it heavily infests the counties between those cities. It expanded its range to the Phoenix area in the first decade of the 2000s and can be found in Maricopa, Pinal, and Pima counties. Rapid spread in Maricopa County occurred due to above-average fall and winter precipitation in 2016, and 2018–2020. Heavy infestations occurred in northern parts of Phoenix and Scottsdale as well as to the south along the I-10 corridor towards Casa Grande. The first recorded growth in Tucson was in 2015.

The plant can be removed physically or killed with triclopyr; it is resistant to glyphosate-based herbicides.

The Arizona department of Agriculture considers it a "high priority pest for quarantine, control or mitigation if a significant threat to a crop, commodity, or habitat is known to exist." Other problems are its density which displaces native vegetation, the high flammability of dried-out patches, and the caustic smoke produced when it burns.

== Conservation status ==
Globe chamomile is a species of "least concern" (low conservation concern) in South Africa.

== Gallery ==
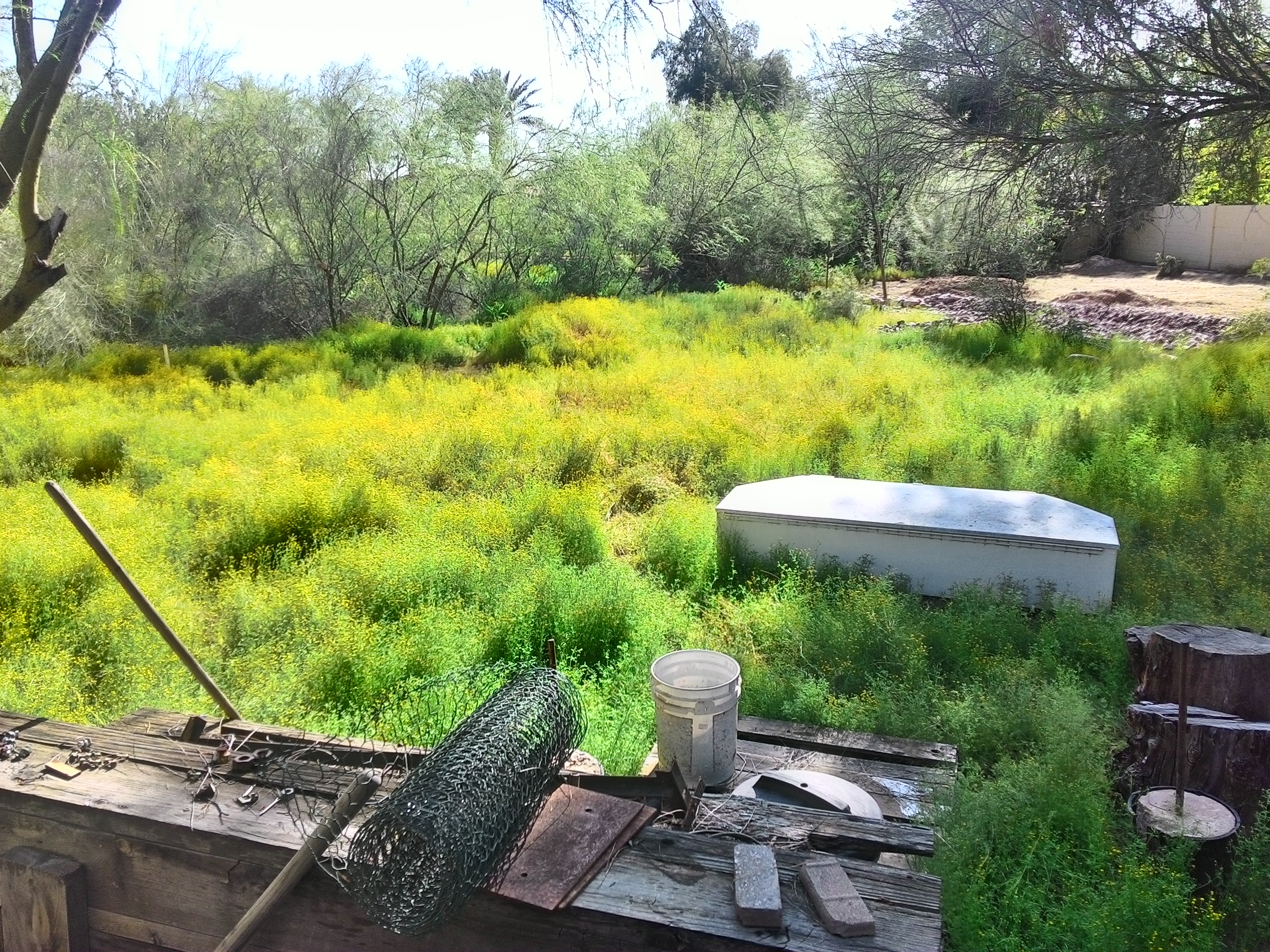
Invasive growth in Arizona

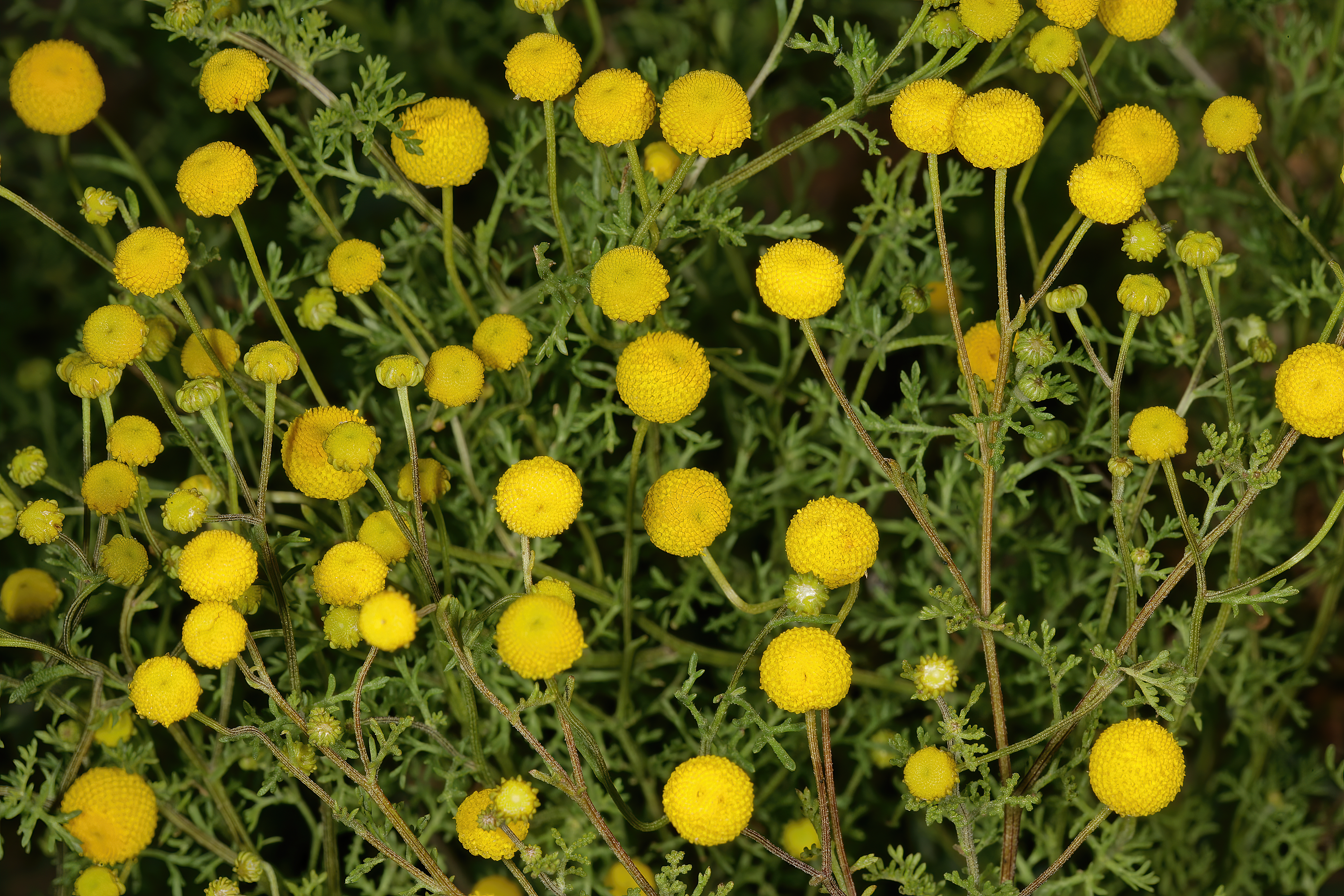
Plant in bloom

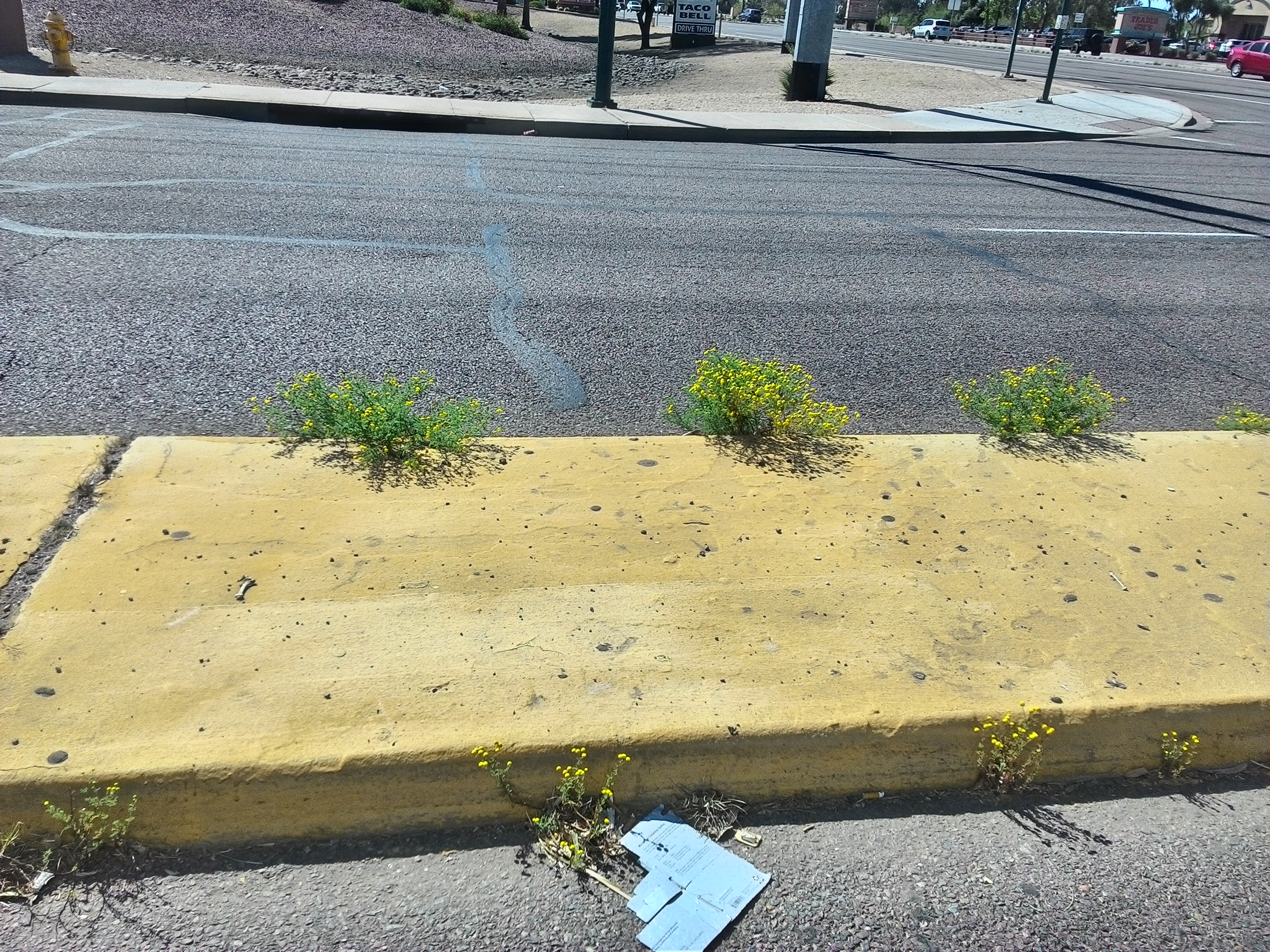
Growing along street in Phoenix, Arizona

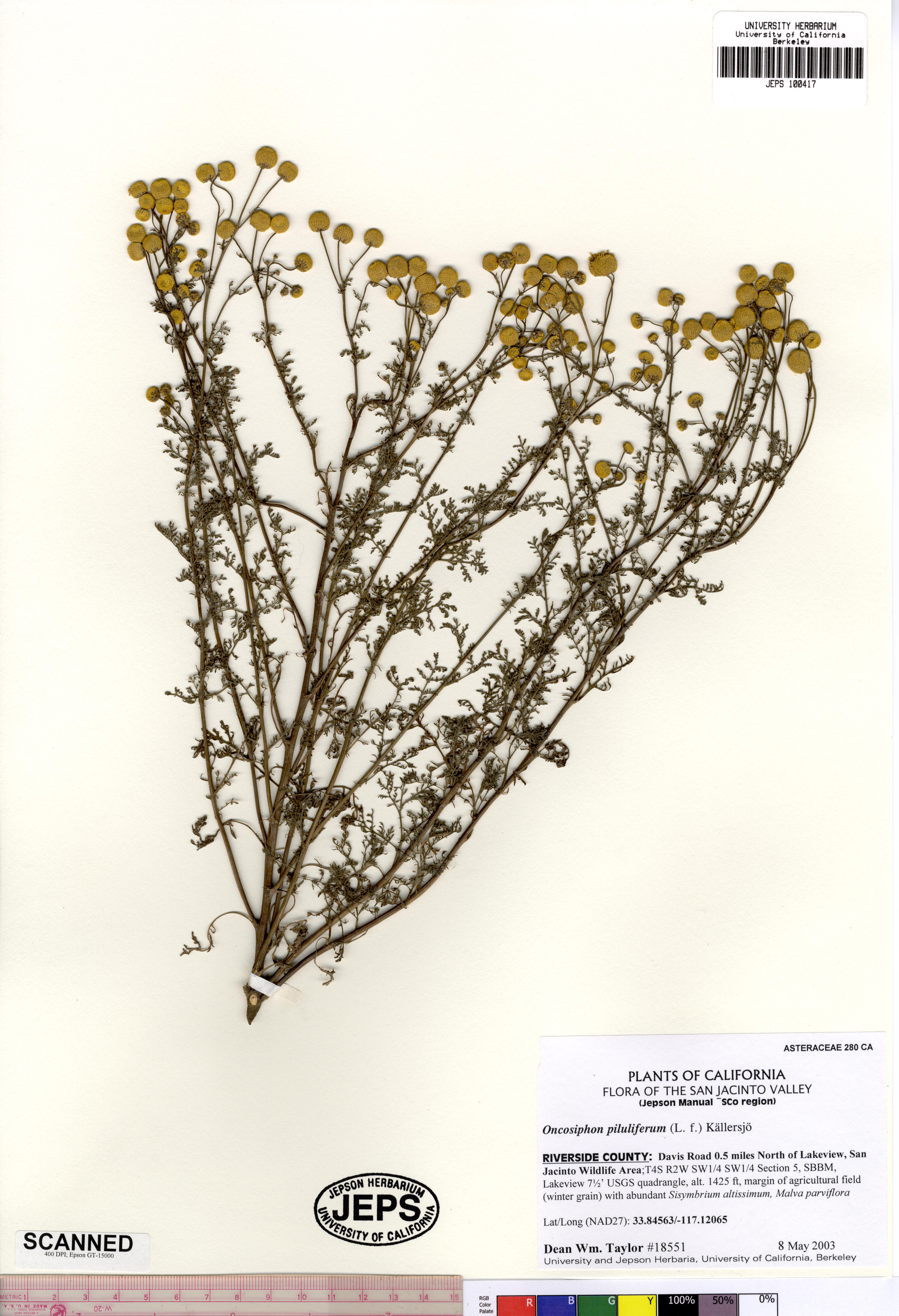
JEPS 100417 UC Berkeley
