= Bromoxynil =

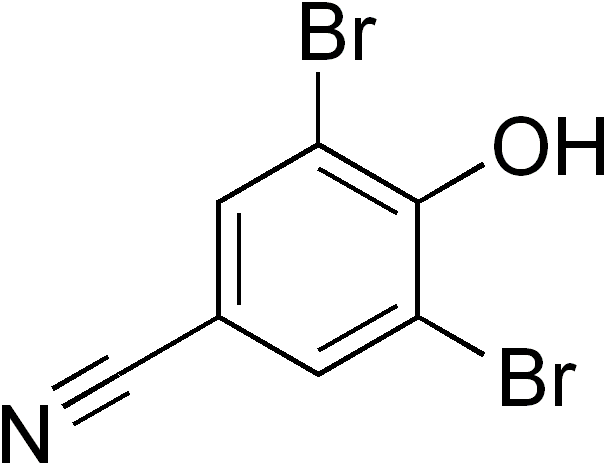

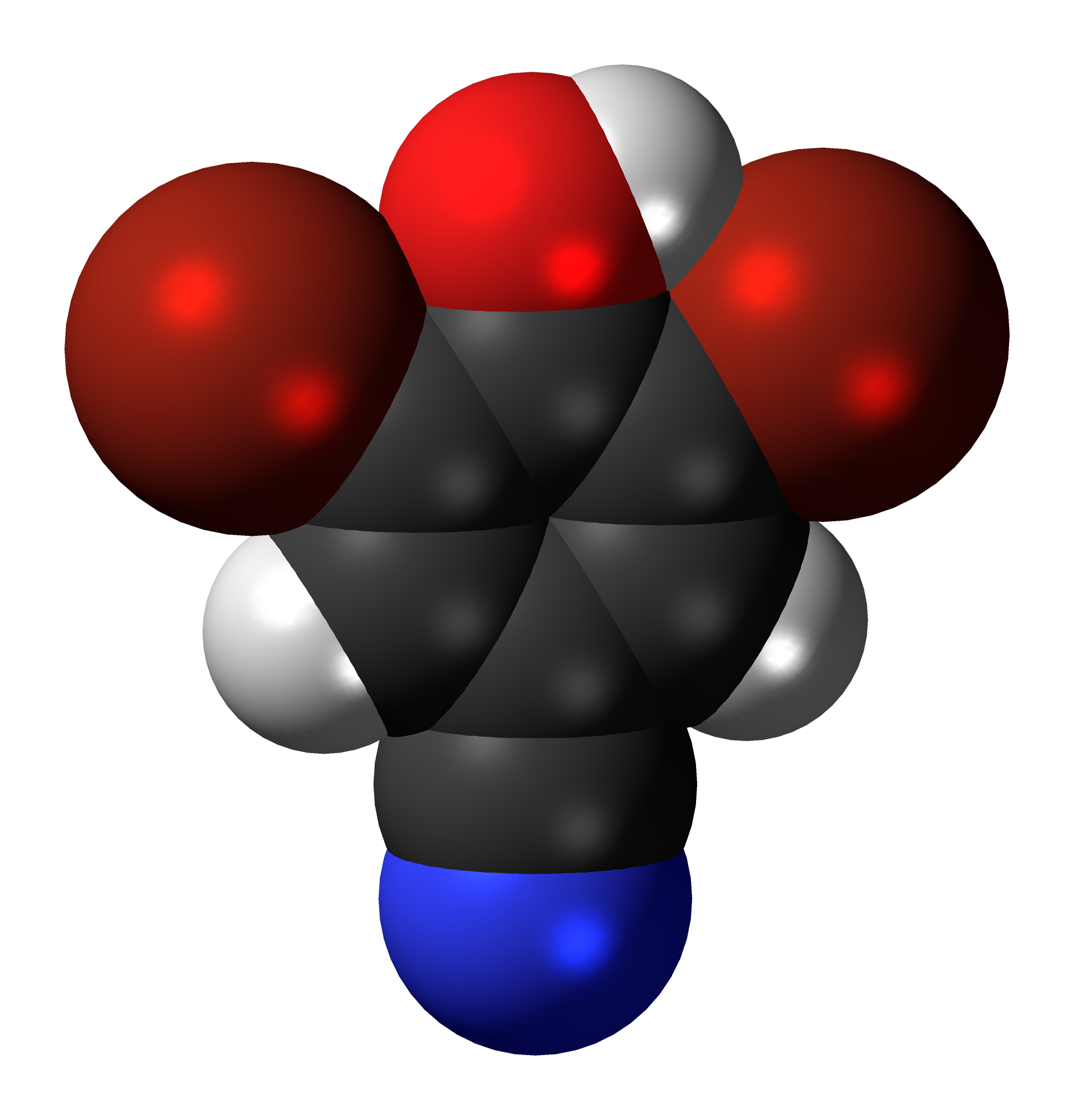

Names
- Preferred IUPAC name 3,5-Dibromo-4-hydroxybenzonitrile
- Other names Brominal, Bromotril, Bronate, Buctril, Certrol B, Litarol, M&B 10064, Merit, Pardner, Sabre, Torch

Identifiers
CAS Number	1689-84-5
3D model (JSmol)	Interactive image
ChEBI	CHEBI:17192
ChEMBL	ChEMBL453905
ChemSpider	14775
ECHA InfoCard	100.015.348
KEGG	C04178
PubChem CID	15531
UNII	J46EK95K0P
CompTox Dashboard (EPA)	DTXSID3022162
- InChI: InChI=1S/C7H3Br2NO/c8-5-1-4(3-10)2-6(9)7(5)11/h1-2,11H Key: UPMXNNIRAGDFEH-UHFFFAOYSA-N; InChI=1/C7H3Br2NO/c8-5-1-4(3-10)2-6(9)7(5)11/h1-2,11H Key: UPMXNNIRAGDFEH-UHFFFAOYAP
- SMILES: Brc1cc(C#N)cc(Br)c1O

Properties
Chemical formula	C_{7}H_{3}Br_{2}NO
Molar mass	276.915 g·mol^{−1}
Appearance	colorless or white solid
Density	2.243 g/mL
Melting point	194–195 °C
Solubility in water	organic solvents

Related compounds
Related compounds	Ioxynil, Chloroxynil, Bromoxynil octanoate
- Except where otherwise noted, data are given for materials in their standard state (at 25 °C [77 °F], 100 kPa). verify (what is ?) Infobox references

Bromoxynil is an organic compound with the formula HOBr_{2}C_{6}H_{2}CN. It is classified as a nitrile herbicide, and as such sold under many trade names. It is a white solid. It works by inhibiting photosynthesis. It is moderately toxic to mammals.

It is used in Australia, New Zealand, and the USA, which used 614,000 lbs of it in 1974.

== Production and use ==
It is produced by bromination of 4-hydroxybenzonitrile.

It is a post-emergence to control annual broadleaved weeds.

Bromoxynil is a Group C / C3 / 6 (Australian, Global, numeric) herbicide under the HRAC classification.

== Degradation ==
Bromoxynil decomposes with a half life of approximately two weeks in soil. Persistence increases in soils with elevated clay or organic matter content, suggesting the compound has somewhat limited bioavailability to microorganisms in these environments. Under aerobic conditions in soils or pure cultures, products of bromoxynil degradation often retain the original bromine groups. The herbicide, and one of its common degradation products (3,5-dibromo-4-hydroxybenzoic acid) have been shown to undergo metabolic reductive dehalogenation by the microorganism Desulfitobacterium chlororespirans. Bromoxynil also breaks down photochemically, by releasing the halogen bromines. In aerobic conditions, it can persist for a month or more.

In the Great Plains region of Canada, where it is widely used on cereal grains, average levels detected in drinking water were 1 nanogram per liter. In one case as high as 384 nanograms per liter were detected. Levels of bromoxynil were consistently lower than of several other pesticides tested, and it was observed to undergo greater reduction in water treatment than the others.

== Safety ==
Lethal doses in mammals range between 60 and 600 milligrams ingested per kilogram, and teratogenic effects have been observed in rats and rabbits above 30 milligrams per kilogram. Chronic exposure for more than one year in humans caused symptoms of weight loss, fever, vomiting, headache, and urinary problems in one documented case.

In the United States it is distributed as a restricted use pesticide in toxicity class II (moderately toxic) and not available for homeowner use.

Bromoxynil's taste is "slight, not characteristic".

== Tradenames ==
Bromoxynil has been sold as: Brominal, Nu-Lawn Weeder, (Union Carbide), Buctril, and Chipco Buctril, (Rhone-Poulenc). This list is incomplete.
