= Trifluoromethylation =

Trifluoromethylation in organic chemistry describes any organic reaction that introduces a trifluoromethyl group in an organic compound. Trifluoromethylated compounds are of some importance in pharmaceutical industry and agrochemicals. Several notable pharmaceutical compounds have a trifluoromethyl group incorporated: fluoxetine, mefloquine, leflunomide, nulitamide, dutasteride, bicalutamide, aprepitant, celecoxib, fipronil, fluazinam, penthiopyrad, picoxystrobin, fluridone, norflurazon, sorafenib, and triflurazin.

The biological activity of trifluoromethyl compounds was first investigated by F. Lehmann in 1927.

== Benzotrifluoride and related compounds ==
An early route to benzotrifluoride was developed by Frédéric Swarts in 1892 who demonstrated the reaction between antimony fluoride and benzotrichloride. In the 1930s Kinetic Chemicals and IG Farben replaced SbF_{3} with HF. Benzotrifluoride and several of its derivatives are produced industrially by the reaction of the corresponding trichloromethyl derivatives using hydrogen fluoride:

C_{6}H_{5}CCl_{3} + 3 HF → C_{6}H_{5}CF_{3} + 3 HCl

Many trichloromethylarenes can be prepared by free radical chlorination of the corresponding methyl arenes. Benzotrifluoride and its derivatives are precursors to dyes, pesticides, and solvents.

== Specialty reagents ==
=== Trifluoromethyltrimethylsilane ===
Trifluoromethyltrimethylsilane, known as Ruppert-Prakash reagent, serves as a source of trifluoromethyl anion. Illustrative is the trifluoromethylation of cyclohexanone in THF using tetrabutylammonium fluoride.

Trifluoromethylation using

trifluoromethyltrimethylsilane

The substrates can be aryl halides.

=== Trifluoromethane ===
Fluoroform (CF_{3}H) has been employed as a trifluoromethylation reagent for aldehydes in combination with a strong base.

Trifluoromethylation fluoroform folleas 1998

=== Trifluoroiodomethane ===
The McLoughlin-Thrower reaction (1968) is an early coupling reaction using iodofluoroalkanes, iodoaromatic compounds using copper. In 1969 Kobayashi & Kumadaki adapted their protocol for trifluoromethylations.

McLoughlin-Thrower reaction (1968)

Trifluoroiodomethane is a reagent in aromatic coupling reactions. It has also been used with enones, for example with chalcone, a reaction catalysed by diethyl zinc and Wilkinson's catalyst:

Trifluoromethylation using diethyl zinc and Wilkinson's catalyst

=== Trifluoromethyl sulfone ===
Trifluoromethyl sulfone (PhSO_{2}CF_{3}) and trifluoromethyl sulfoxide (PhSOCF_{3}) can be used for trifluoromethylations of electrophiles

=== Trifluoromethanesulfonyl chloride ===
Trifluoromethanesulfonyl chloride (or triflyl chloride, CF_{3}SO_{2}Cl) can be used to introduce a trifluoromethyl group to aromatic and heteroaromatic systems, including known pharmaceuticals such as Lipitor. The method is general and the conditions mild, requiring a photoredox catalyst and a light source at room temperature.

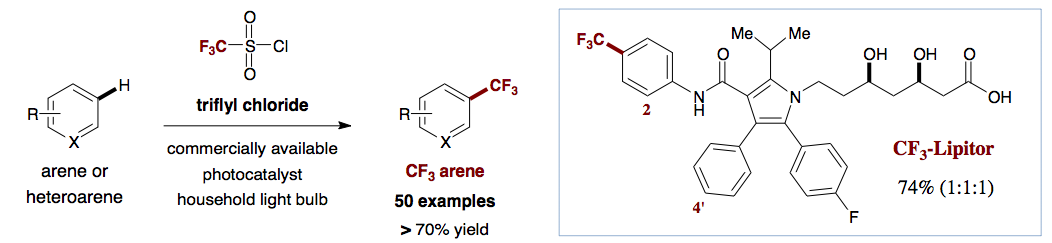

=== Sodium trifluoromethanesulfinate ===
Sodium trifluoromethanesulfinate (CF_{3}SO_{2}Na) as a trifluoromethylation reagent was introduced by Langlois in 1991. The reaction requires t-butyl hydroperoxide and generally a metal and proceeds through a radical mechanism. The reagent has been applied with heterocyclic substrates

Trifluorination Langlois reagent 2011

=== Umemoto reagents ===
5-(Trifluoromethyl)dibenzothiophenium tetrafluoroborate, a common Umemoto reagent

Umemoto reagents are (trifluoromethyl)dibenzoheterocyclic salts, such as 5-(trifluoromethyl)dibenzothiophenium triflate and 5-(trifluoromethyl)dibenzothiophenium tetrafluoroborate.

=== Trifluoromethyl-metal reagents ===
Many CF_{3}-containing metal complexes have been prepared, and some are useful for trifluoromethylation.

Trifluoromethyl copper(I) reagents are more useful. These reagents are generated in situ by reaction of CF_{3}I with copper powder in polar solvents. Hg(CF_{3})_{2}, prepared by decarboxylation of the trifluoroacetate, has proven useful for the trifluoromethylation of other metals, although for low-temperature reactions it may prove useful to transmetallate to bis(trifluoromethyl)cadmium.

The use of sodium trifluoroacetate in the presence of copper salts was introduced by Matsui in 1981. In the original scope the substrate was an aromatic halide and the metal salt copper(I)iodide.

==== Comment on LiCF_{3} ====
The reagent is CF_{3}Li would seem to be an obvious reagent fo trifluoromethylations. Indeed, it can be generated by lithium-iodide exchange. Such solutions are however unstable even at low temperatures, degrading to lithium fluoride and difluorocarbene.

== Reaction types ==
=== Aromatic coupling reactions ===
In coupling reactions between aromatic compounds and metal-trifluoromethyl complexes the metal is usually copper, Pd and Ni are less prominent. The reactions are stoichiometric or catalytic. In the McLoughlin-Thrower reaction (1962) iodobenzene reacts with trifluoroiodomethane (CF_{3}I) and copper powder in dimethylformamide at 150 °C to trifluorotoluene. The intermediate in this reaction type is a perfluoromethyl-metal complex.

A palladium acetate catalysed reaction described in 1982 used zinc powder with the main intermediate believed to be CF_{3}ZnI with Pd(0) is the active catalyst. The first copper catalysed coupling was reported in 2009 and based on an iodoarene, a trifluoromethylsilane, copper iodide and 1,10-phenanthroline. Variations include another CF_{3} donor potassium (trifluoromethyl)trimethoxyborate, the use of aryl boronic acids or the use of a trifluoromethyl sulfonium salt or the use of a trifluoromethylcopper(I) phenanthroline complex. A catalytic palladium catalysed reaction was reported in 2010 using aryl halides, (trifluoromethyl)triethylsilane and allylpalladium chloride dimer

Aromatic trifluoromethylation Kitazume 1982	Aromatic trifluoromethylation Oishi 2009
Aromatic trifluoromethylation Kitazume 1982	Aromatic catalytic trifluoromethylation Oishi 2009

=== Radical trifluoromethylation ===
In radical trifluoromethylation the active species is the trifluoromethyl free radical. Reagents such as bromotrifluoromethane and haloform have been used for this purpose but in response to the Montreal Protocol alternatives such as trifluoroiodomethane have been developed as replacement. One particular combination is CF_{3}I / triethylborane Other reagents that generate the CF_{3} radical are sodium trifluoromethanesulfinate and bis(trifluoroacetyl) peroxide.

Trifluoromethylation using CF_{3}I and triethylborane.

The base is 2,6-lutidine

In the CF_{3} radical the fluorine atom is an electron-withdrawing group via the inductive effect but also a weak pi donor through interaction of the fluorine lone pair with the radical center's SOMO. Compared to the methyl radical the CF_{3} radical is pyramidal (angle 107.8 °C ) with a large inversion barrier, electrophilic and also more reactive. In reaction with styrene it is 440 times more reactive. An early report (1949) describes the photochemical reaction of iodotrifluoromethane with ethylene to 3-iodo-1,1,1-trifluoropropane. Reagents that have been reported for the direct trifluoromethylation of arenes are CF_{3}I, CF_{3}Br (thermal or photochemical), silver trifluoroacetate/TiO_{2} (photochemical) and sodium trifluoromethanesulfinate/Cu(OSO_{2}CF_{3})_{2}/tBuOOH.

=== Nucleophilic trifluoromethylation ===
In nucleophilic trifluoromethylation the active species is the CF_{3}^{−} anion. It was, however, widely believed that the trifluoromethyl anion is a transient species and thus cannot be isolated or observed in the condensed phase. Contrary to the popular belief, the CF_{3} anion, with [K(18-crown-6)]^{+} as a countercation, was produced and characterized by Prakash and coworkers. The challenges associated with observation of CF_{3} anion are alluded to its strong basic nature and its tendency to form pentacoordinated silicon species, such as [Me_{3}Si(CF_{3})_{2}]^{−} or [Me_{3}Si(F)(CF_{3})]^{−}.

The reactivity of fluoroform in combination with a strong base such as t-BuOK with carbonyl compounds in DMF is an example. Here CF_{3}^{−} and DMF form an hemiaminolate adduct ([Me_{2}NCH(O)CF_{3}]K).

trifluoromethylation using methyl fluorosulfonyldifluoroacetate.

The intermediate is CF_{3}Cu

=== Electrophilic trifluoromethylation ===
In electrophilic trifluoromethylation the active trifluoromethyl donor group carries a positive charge. Production of an CF_{3}^{+} cation has been described as "extremely hard" The first relevant reagent, a diaryl(trifluoromethyl) sulfonium salt (Ar_{2}S^{+}CF_{3}SbF_{6}^{−}) was developed in 1984 by reaction of an aryltrifluoromethyl sulfoxide with trifluorosulfonium hexafluoroantimonate (SF_{3}^{+}SbF_{6}^{−}) to form an aryltrifluoromethyl fluorosulfonium salt, followed by reaction with an electron-rich arene. The reagent was used in trifluoromethylation of a thiophenolate. S-(trifluoromethyl)dibenzothiophenium tetrafluoroborate is a commercially available and known trifluoromethylation reagent based on the same principle first documented in 1990. In this type of compound sulfur has been replaced by oxygen, selenium and tellurium. Examples of substrates that have been investigated are pyridine, aniline, triphenylphosphine and the lithium salt of phenylacetylene.

Electrophilic Perfluoroalkylating Agents
5-(Trifluoromethyl)dibenzothiophenium trifluoromethanesulfonate	5-(Trifluoromethyl)dibenzothiophenium tetrafluoroborate	3,3-Dimethyl-1-(trifluoromethyl)-1,2-benziodoxole
5-(Trifluoromethyl)dibenzothiophenium trifluoromethanesulfonate	5-(Trifluoromethyl)dibenzothiophenium tetrafluoroborate	3,3-Dimethyl-1-(trifluoromethyl)-1,2-benziodoxole

Another group of trifluoromethyl donors are hypervalent iodine(III)–CF_{3} reagents for example 3,3-dimethyl-1-(trifluoromethyl)-1,2-benziodoxole. Some of these are known as Togni reagents, such as Togni reagent II. Substrates are thiols, alcohols, phosphines, (hetero) arenes, unactivated olefins and unsaturated carboxylic acids.

Trifluoromethylation at a thiol group using hypervalent iodine

The reaction mechanism of electrophilic trifluoromethylations has been described as controversial with polar substitution or single electron transfer as likely candidates.

== Asymmetric trifluoromethylation ==
In asymmetric trifluoromethylation the trifluoromethyl group is added to the substrate in an enantioselective way. Ruppert's reagent has been used for this purpose in an asymmetric induction approach to functionalise chiral amino acid derivates, saccharides, and steroids. Because Ruppert's reagent requires a tetraalkylammonium fluoride, chiral ammonium fluorides have been employed in asymmetric catalysis. In the field of electrophilic trifluoromethylation an early contribution involved reaction of a metal enolate with a trifluoromethyl chalcogen salt in presence of a chiral boron catalyst.

Asymmetic trifluorination Iseki 1994	Asymmetic trifluorination Caron 2003
Asymmetric trifluoromethylation Iseki 1994	Asymmetric trifluormethylation Caron 2003

Enantioselective methods for the α-trifluoromethylation of carbonyls are available through enamine catalysis of aldehydes (photoredox or iodonium), copper catalysis of β-ketoesters, and radical addition to zirconium enolates.

== Trifluoromethyl cation ==
Trifluoromethyl cation
- trifluoromethyl cation The structure of the cation.

Names
- Systematic IUPAC name Trifluoromethylcarbenium

Identifiers
CAS Number	18851-76-8
3D model (JSmol)	Interactive image
ChemSpider	103873144
PubChem CID	12484687
- InChI: InChI=1S/CF3/c2-1(3)4/q+1 Key: VRLAJHMZTGBAOE-UHFFFAOYSA-N
- SMILES: [C+](F)(F)F

Properties
Chemical formula	CF_{3}^{+}
Molar mass	69.0054
Solubility in water	reacts

Structure
Molecular shape	Trigonal planar
- Except where otherwise noted, data are given for materials in their standard state (at 25 °C [77 °F], 100 kPa). Infobox references

The trifluoromethyl cation is a molecular cation with a formula of CF^{+}_{3}. It is a carbocation due to its positively charged carbon atom. It is part of the family of carbenium ions, with three fluorine atoms as substituents in place of its hydrogen atoms.

Compared to methenium (the simplest carbenium ion), trifluoromethyl cation is more stable due to the presence of fluorine atoms. The fluorine atoms have lone pairs of electrons overlapping with the carbon atom. These electrons stabilize the positive charge of the central carbon atom, stabilizing the molecule as a whole. The overlap is effective due to the size of fluorine's p orbital in the molecule.

The chemical generation of a CF^{+}_{3} cation has been described as "extremely hard". Gas-phase trifluoromethylcarbenium ions may be obtained via electron ionization of carbon tetrafluoride, but trifluoromethylcarbenium salts have never been isolated, and are not expected to be stable: the predicted standard enthalpy of reaction for CF_{4} + SbF_{5} → [CF_{3}]^{+}[SbF_{6}]^{−} is +19 kcal·mol^{−1}.
