= Trichloromethyl group =

Functional group, formula –CCl3

Structure of the trichloromethyl group

The trichloromethyl group is a functional group that has the formula −CCl_{3}. The naming of this group is derived from the methyl group (which has the formula −CH_{3}), by replacing each hydrogen atom by a chlorine atom. Compounds with this group are a subclass of the organochlorines.

Trichloromethyl is an electron withdrawing group owing to the electronegativity of the three chlorides.

Group Electronegativity
Methyl group	Formula	Electronegativity
Methyl	CH_{3}	2.472
Phenyl	C_{6}H_{5}	2.717
Chloromethyl	CH_{2}Cl	2.538
Dichloromethyl	CHCl_{2}	2.602
Trichloromethyl	CCl_{3}	2.666
Trifluoromethyl	CF_{3}	2.985

== Trichloromethyl alkanes and derivatives ==
Some simple trichloromethyl compounds include trichloromethane, also known as chloroform (HCCl_{3}), 1,1,1-trichloroethane (H_{3}CCCl_{3}), and hexachloroethane (Cl_{3}CCCl_{3}). Trichloromethanol is however unstable, reflecting the lability associated with the RO-C-Cl center. Indeed, triphosgene (bis(trichloromethyl) carbonate, OC(OCCl_{3})_{2}) fragments upon heating by scission of a C-Cl bond. It is used as a substitute for phosgene.

Because the trichloromethyl group is relatively electronegative, the behavior of trichloromethyl-substituted compounds can differ sharply vs the behavior of the methyl parents. The acidity constant (pK_{a}) of trichloroacetic acid CCl_{3}CO_{2}H is 0.77, whereas that of acetic acid is 4.76. In other words, trichloroacetic acid is 1000x the stronger acid. In a related manner, the trichloromethyl aldehyde CCl_{3}CHO (chloral) tends to hydrate to give chloral hydrate CCl_{3}CH(OH)_{2}.

== Trichloromethyl arenes ==
Many trichloromethylarenes can be prepared by chlorination of the corresponding methyl arenes. For example toluene and the xylene isomers as well as their substituted derivatives can often be converted to the corresponding trichloromethyl derivatives simply by treatment with chlorine. The conversion involves a free radical reaction:

C_{6}H_{5}CH_{3} + 3 Cl_{2} → C_{6}H_{5}CCl_{3} + 3 HCl
C_{6}H_{4}(CH_{3})_{2} + 6 Cl_{2} → C_{6}H_{4}(CCl_{3})_{2} + 6 HCl

These trichloromethyl compounds are produced on an industrial scale as precursors to other useful compounds. Partial hydrolysis of benzotrichloride provides a route to benzoyl chloride:

C_{6}H_{5}CCl_{3} + H_{2}O → C_{6}H_{5}COCl + 2 HCl

By reaction with hydrogen fluoride, trichloromethylated arenes convert to trifluoromethyl derivatives and hydrogen chloride, which can be recycled. In this way, benzotrifluoride (C_{6}H_{5}CF_{3})and bis(trifluoromethyl)benzene are produced commercially:

C_{6}H_{5}CCl_{3} + 3 HF → C_{6}H_{5}CF_{3} + 3 HCl
C_{6}H_{4}(CCl_{3})_{2} + 6 HF → C_{6}H_{4}(CF_{3})_{2} + 6 HCl

== Bioactive derivatives ==
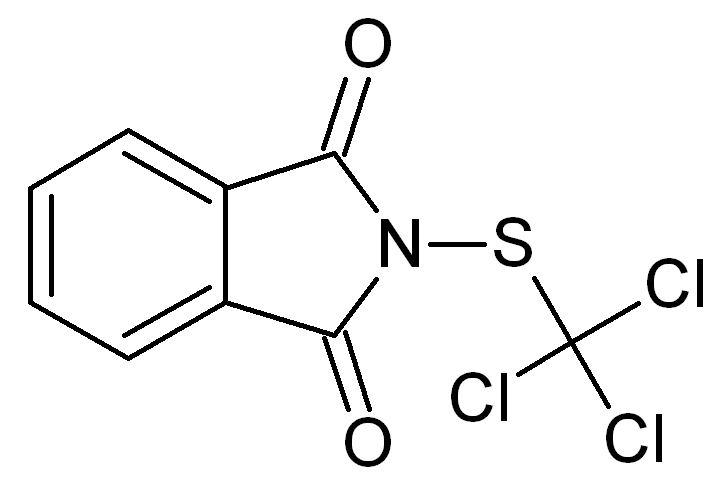
Folpet, a trichloromethyl-containing insecticide.

A trichloromethyl-containing agricultural chemical is nitrapyrin, which inhibits nitrification, i.e. it enhances the efficiency of fertilizers.

Trichloromethyl-containing insecticides include metrifonate and Folpet.

The list of trichloromethyl-containing pharmaceuticals includes the anorectic drug Amfecloral and the sedative triclofos.

== Trichloromethyl radical ==
The trichloromethyl radical (Cl_{3}C·) is a well known but transient intermediate in reactions. It is the agent responsible for the toxicity of carbon tetrachloride.
