= C7H5Cl3 =

The molecular formula C_{7}H_{5}Cl_{3} may refer to:

- Benzotrichloride
- Trichlorotoluene
