= C7H6Cl2 =

The molecular formula C_{7}H_{6}Cl_{2} may refer to:

- Benzal chloride
- Dichlorotoluene
