= Togni reagent II =

Names
- Preferred IUPAC name 1-(Trifluoromethyl)-1λ^{3},2-benziodoxol-3(1H)-one
- Other names Togni's reagent II; Togni reagent 2

Identifiers
CAS Number	887144-94-7
3D model (JSmol)	Interactive image
ChemSpider	24807962
ECHA InfoCard	100.214.822
PubChem CID	24850981
UNII	DHY074A7WG
CompTox Dashboard (EPA)	DTXSID10647708
- InChI: InChI=1S/C8H4F3IO2/c9-8(10,11)12-6-4-2-1-3-5(6)7(13)14-12/h1-4H Key: XHEOXSQMBWJOKP-UHFFFAOYSA-N
- SMILES: C1=CC=C2C(=C1)C(=O)OI2C(F)(F)F

Properties
Chemical formula	C_{8}H_{4}F_{3}IO_{2}
Molar mass	316.018 g·mol^{−1}
Appearance	colorless crystalline solid
Melting point	122.4–123.4 °C (252.3–254.1 °F; 395.5–396.5 K)
Solubility in water	soluble in methylene chloride, chloroform, acetonitrile, methanol, ethanol, acetone

Hazards
- GHS labelling
Pictograms	(GHS07: Exclamation mark)
Signal word	Warning
Hazard statements	H315, H319, H335
Precautionary statements	P261, P264, P271, P280, P302+P352, P304+P340, P305+P351+P338, P312, P321, P332+P313, P337+P313, P362, P403+P233, P405, P501
- Except where otherwise noted, data are given for materials in their standard state (at 25 °C [77 °F], 100 kPa). Infobox references

Togni reagent II (1-trifluoromethyl-1,2-benziodoxol-3(1H)-one) is a chemical compound used in organic synthesis for direct electrophilic trifluoromethylation.

== History ==
Synthesis, properties, and reactivity of the compound were first described in 2006 by Antonio Togni and his coworkers at ETH Zurich. The article also contains information on Togni reagent I (1,3-dihydro-3,3-dimethyl-1-(trifluoromethyl)-1,2-benziodoxole).

== Preparation ==
The synthesis consists of three steps. In the first step, 2-iodobenzoic acid is oxidized by sodium periodate and cyclized to 1-hydroxy-1,2-benziodoxol-3(1H)-one. The target compound can then be obtained by acylation with acetic anhydride and subsequent substitution reaction with trifluoromethyltrimethylsilane.

Alternatively, trichloroisocyanuric acid can be used as oxidant in the place of sodium periodate for a newer one-pot synthesis method.

== Properties ==
=== Physical properties ===
The compound crystallized in a monoclinic crystal structure. The space group is P2_{1}/n with four molecules in the unit cell. From the crystallographic data, a density of 2.365 g·cm^{−3} was deduced.

=== Chemical properties ===
Pure Togni reagent II is metastable at room temperature. Heating it above the melting point will lead to strong exothermic decomposition, in which trifluoroiodomethane (CF_{3}I) is released. The heat of composition at a temperature of 149 °C and higher has been determined to be 502 J·g^{−1}. From recrystallization in acetonitrile, small amounts of trifluoromethyl-2-iodobenzoate and 2-iodobenzyl fluoride were observed as decomposition products. Togni reagent II reacts violently with strong bases and acids, as well as reductants. In tetrahydrofuran, the compound polymerizes.

== Uses ==
Togni reagent II is used for trifluoromethylation of organic compounds. For phenolates, the substitution takes place preferably in the ortho position. It is possible to obtain a second substitution by using an excess of Togni reagent II.

Reactions with alcohols yield the corresponding trifluoromethyl ethers.

Trifluoromethylation of alkenes is possible under copper catalysis.
