= C7H7Cl =

The molecular formula C_{7}H_{7}Cl (molar mass: 126.58 g/mol, exact mass: 126.0236 u) may refer to:

- Benzyl chloride, or α-chlorotoluene
- Chlorotoluenes
