= 3-Chlorobenzonitrile =

Names
- Preferred IUPAC name 3-Chlorobenzonitrile
- Other names meta-Chlorobenzonitrile

Identifiers
CAS Number	766-84-7
3D model (JSmol)	Interactive image
ChemSpider	12474
ECHA InfoCard	100.011.065
EC Number	212-172-6
PubChem CID	13015
UNII	LD58GX58VW
CompTox Dashboard (EPA)	DTXSID20227414
- InChI: InChI=1S/C7H4ClN/c8-7-3-1-2-6(4-7)5-9/h1-4H Key: WBUOVKBZJOIOAE-UHFFFAOYSA-N
- SMILES: C1=CC(=CC(=C1)Cl)C#N

Properties
Chemical formula	C_{7}H_{4}ClN
Molar mass	137.57 g·mol^{−1}
Appearance	colorless solid
Melting point	40–41 °C (104–106 °F; 313–314 K)

Hazards
- GHS labelling
Pictograms	(GHS06: Toxic) (GHS07: Exclamation mark)
Signal word	Danger
Hazard statements	H302, H312, H319
Precautionary statements	P264, P270, P273, P280, P301+P312, P302+P352, P305+P351+P338, P312, P322, P330, P337+P313, P361, P363, P405, P501
- Except where otherwise noted, data are given for materials in their standard state (at 25 °C [77 °F], 100 kPa). Infobox references

3-Chlorobenzonitrile is an organic compound with the chemical formula ClC_{6}H_{4}CN. It is one of the isomers of chlorobenzonitrile.

== Preparation and reactions ==
Typically, aryl nitriles are produced by ammoxidation. 3-Chlorobenzonitrile can also be produced by dehydration of the aldoxime of 3-chlorobenzaldehyde. It can also be produced by heating 3-chlorobenzylamine and iodine in ammonium acetate aqueous solution.

In the presence of copper nanoparticles, 3-chlorobenzonitrile can be reduced by sodium borohydride to 3-chlorobenzylamine. Some ruthenium catalyzers can catalysis the hydrolysis of 3-chlorobenzonitrile to form 3-chlorobenzamide.
