= Trifluoromethyl group =

Functional group

Chemical structure of the trifluoromethyl group

The trifluoromethyl group is a functional group that has the formula −CF_{3}. The naming of is group is derived from the methyl group (which has the formula −CH_{3}), by replacing each hydrogen atom by a fluorine atom. Some common examples are trifluoromethane H−CF_{3}, 1,1,1-trifluoroethane H_{3}C−CF_{3}, and hexafluoroacetone F_{3}C−CO−CF_{3}. Compounds with this group are a subclass of the organofluorines.

== Properties ==
The trifluoromethyl group has a significant electronegativity that is often described as being intermediate between the electronegativities of fluorine and chlorine. For this reason, trifluoromethyl-substituted compounds are often strong acids, such as trifluoromethanesulfonic acid and trifluoroacetic acid. Conversely, the trifluoromethyl group lowers the basicity of compounds like N-trifluoromethyl azoles.

== Uses ==
The trifluoromethyl group occurs in certain pharmaceuticals, drugs, and abiotically synthesized natural fluorocarbon based compounds. The medicinal use of the trifluoromethyl group dates from 1928, although research became more intense in the mid-1940s. The trifluoromethyl group is often used as a bioisostere to create derivatives by replacing a chloride or a methyl group. This can be used to adjust the steric and electronic properties of a lead compound, or to protect a reactive methyl group from metabolic oxidation. Some notable drugs containing trifluoromethyl groups include efavirenz (Sustiva), an HIV reverse transcriptase inhibitor; fluoxetine (Prozac), an antidepressant; and celecoxib (Celebrex), a nonsteroidal anti-inflammatory drug.

Similar to pharmaceuticals, many pesticides also contain one or more trifluoromethyl groups. Sulfoxaflor is used as a systemic insecticide. Trifluralin, as with several dinitritroaniline herbicides, is a trifluoromethyl herbicide. Fluazifop is another, a phenoxy herbicide. Fipronil, for example, contains two trifluoromethyl groups.

Hexafluoroisopropanol and trifluoroethanol have applications as specialist solvents. Compared to their non-fluorinated counterparts, they have reduced boiling points, increased polarity, reduced nucleophilicity, a greater propensity to donate hydrogen bonds, and a much weaker propensity to accept hydrogen bonds.

== Synthesis ==
Trifluoromethylated arenes such as benzotrifluoride and bis(trifluoromethyl)benzene are typically produced on scale from trichloromethyl precursors:

C_{6}H_{5}CCl_{3} + 3 HF → C_{6}H_{5}CF_{3} + 3 HCl
C_{6}H_{4}(CCl_{3})_{2} + 6 HF → C_{6}H_{4}(CF_{3})_{2} + 6 HCl

Carboxylic acids can be converted to trifluoromethyl groups by treatment with sulfur tetrafluoride. Many specialized reagents have been developed in this area including antimony trifluoride (the Swarts reaction), trifluoromethyl copper, and Ruppert's reagent.

== See also ==
- Trifluromethyl cation
- Trichloromethyl group
- Trifluoromethoxy group
- Fluoroethyl
