= Trifluoromethoxy group =

Functional group

Trifluoromethoxy group

The trifluoromethoxy group is the chemical group –O–CF_{3}. It can be seen as a methoxy group –O–CH_{3} whose hydrogen atoms are replaced by fluorine atoms or as a trifluoromethyl group attached to the rest of the molecule by a bridging oxygen atom. Either leads to viable syntheses, but in 2022 "the synthesis of CF_{3}O^{-} compounds suffer[ed] from restricted methods and remain[ed] difficult. In particular, the direct introduction of the CF_{3}O motif onto organic substrates [was] still poorly described," partly because trifluoromethoxide easily decomposes to difluorophosgene.

Compounds having this functional group are of some relevance as pharmaceuticals, because it is a much more hydrophobic analogue of chlorine. One example is riluzole.

== See also ==
- Trifluoromethylation
