= Chlorobenzonitrile =

Chlorobenzonitrile may refer to:

- 2-Chlorobenzonitrile
- 3-Chlorobenzonitrile
- 4-Chlorobenzonitrile
- 2,6-Dichlorobenzonitrile
