= Triodide =

Triodide may refer to:

- (usually lower case) a common misspelling for triiodide, the I_{3}^{−} ion in chemistry
- (usually capitalized) Orion Safety and Pacific Dynamics trademarked brand name for Trifluoroiodomethane
