= 2-Chlorobenzonitrile =

Names
- IUPAC name 2-Chlorobenzonitrile
- Other names o-Chlorobenzonitrile

Identifiers
| CAS Number | 873-32-5 |
| 3D model (JSmol) | Interactive image |
| ChEMBL | ChEMBL3248211 |
| ChemSpider | 12818 |
| ECHA InfoCard | 100.011.669 |
| EC Number | 212-836-5 |
| PubChem CID | 13391 |
| UNII | C8Z5NE7QXJ |
| CompTox Dashboard (EPA) | DTXSID5052593 |
- InChI: InChI=1S/C7H4ClN/c8-7-4-2-1-3-6(7)5-9/h1-4H Key: NHWQMJMIYICNBP-UHFFFAOYSA-N
- SMILES: C1=CC=C(C(=C1)C#N)Cl

Properties
| Chemical formula | C_{7}H_{4}ClN |
| Molar mass | 137.57 g·mol^{−1} |
| Appearance | white solid |
| Melting point | 44.6 °C (112.3 °F; 317.8 K) |

Hazards
- GHS labelling
| Pictograms | (GHS07: Exclamation mark) |
| Signal word | Warning |
| Hazard statements | H302, H312, H319 |
| Precautionary statements | P264, P270, P280, P301+P312, P302+P352, P305+P351+P338, P312, P322, P330, P337+P313, P363, P501 |
- Except where otherwise noted, data are given for materials in their standard state (at 25 °C [77 °F], 100 kPa). Infobox references

2-Chlorobenzonitrile is an organic compound with the formula ClC_{6}H_{4}CN. It is a white solid. The compound, one of three isomers of chlorobenzonitrile, is produced industrially by ammoxidation of 2-chlorotoluene. The compound is of commercial interest as a precursor to 2-amino-5-nitrobenzonitrile, a precursor to dyes.

2-Chlorobenzonitrile is the starting material used in the ketamine synthesis.
