= 4-Chlorobenzonitrile =

Names
- IUPAC name 4-Chlorobenzonitrile
- Other names p-Chlorobenzonitrile

Identifiers
CAS Number	623-03-0
3D model (JSmol)	Interactive image
ChEMBL	ChEMBL3188114
ChemSpider	11663
ECHA InfoCard	100.009.788
EC Number	210-765-4
PubChem CID	12163
UNII	4Z0HGP3A8A
CompTox Dashboard (EPA)	DTXSID8044703
- InChI: InChI=1S/C7H4ClN/c8-7-3-1-6(5-9)2-4-7/h1-4H Key: GJNGXPDXRVXSEH-UHFFFAOYSA-N
- SMILES: C1=CC(=CC=C1C#N)Cl

Properties
Chemical formula	C_{7}H_{4}ClN
Molar mass	137.57 g·mol^{−1}
Appearance	white solid
Melting point	97 °C (207 °F; 370 K)

Hazards
- GHS labelling
Pictograms	(GHS06: Toxic) (GHS07: Exclamation mark)
Signal word	Danger
Hazard statements	H302, H311, H319, H332, H412
Precautionary statements	P261, P264, P270, P271, P273, P280, P301+P312, P302+P352, P304+P312, P304+P340, P305+P351+P338, P312, P321, P322, P330, P332+P313, P337+P313, P361, P362, P363, P403+P233, P405, P501
- Except where otherwise noted, data are given for materials in their standard state (at 25 °C [77 °F], 100 kPa). Infobox references

4-Chlorobenzonitrile is an organic compound with the formula ClC_{6}H_{4}CN. It is a white solid. The compound, one of three isomers of chlorobenzonitrile, is produced industrially by ammoxidation of 4-chlorotoluene. The compound is of commercial interest as a precursor to pigments.
