= Sodium trifluoromethanesulfinate =

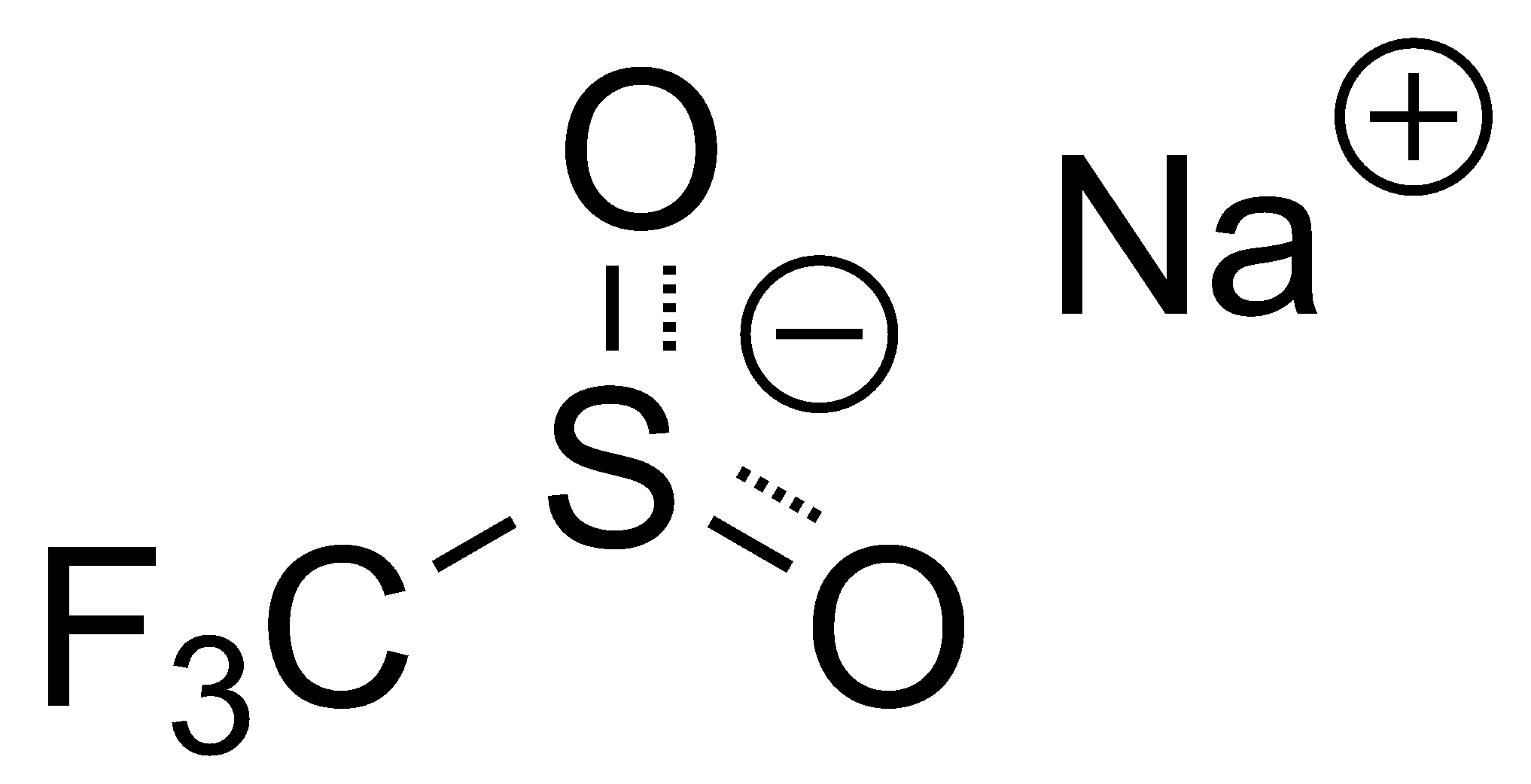
- Structure of sodium trifluoromethylsulfinate

Names
- Preferred IUPAC name Sodium trifluoromethanesulfinate

Identifiers
CAS Number	2926-29-6
3D model (JSmol)	Interactive image
ChemSpider	2059266
ECHA InfoCard	100.203.570
PubChem CID	23690734
CompTox Dashboard (EPA)	DTXSID50635644
- InChI: InChI=1S/CHF3O2S.Na/c2-1(3,4)7(5)6;/h(H,5,6);/q;+1/p-1 Key: KAVUKAXLXGRUCD-UHFFFAOYSA-M; InChI=1/CHF3O2S.Na/c2-1(3,4)7(5)6;/h(H,5,6);/q;+1/p-1 Key: KAVUKAXLXGRUCD-REWHXWOFAL
- SMILES: [Na+].FC(F)(F)S([O-])=O

Properties
Chemical formula	CF_{3}NaO_{2}S
Molar mass	156.05 g·mol^{−1}
- Except where otherwise noted, data are given for materials in their standard state (at 25 °C [77 °F], 100 kPa). Infobox references

Sodium trifluoromethanesulfinate (CF_{3}SO_{2}Na) is the sodium salt of trifluoromethanesulfinic acid. Together with t-butyl hydroperoxide, an oxidant, this compound was found to be a suitable reagent for introducing trifluoromethyl groups onto electron-rich aromatic compounds by Langlois; this reagent is also known as the Langlois reagent. This reaction operates via a free radical mechanism.

This reagent is also able to trifluoromethylate electron-deficient aromatic compounds under biphasic conditions. Zinc difluoromethanesulfinate, a related polymeric coordination complex, is able to introduce difluoromethyl groups (CHF_{2}-) onto aromatic compounds under similar biphasic conditions as well.

With the use of DMSO as an oxidant, it provides an environmentally friendly way for the synthesis of β-trifluoromethyl alcohols from alkenes.
