= G. K. Surya Prakash =

G. K. Surya Prakash (born 1953) is a distinguished professor of chemistry, chemical engineering and materials science and holder of the George A. and Judith A. Olah Nobel Laureate Chair in Hydrocarbon Chemistry at the Department of Chemistry at the University of Southern California. He serves as the director of the Loker Hydrocarbon Research Institute, where he maintains his prominent research lab. He also served as the chairman of the Chemistry Department for four years between 2017 and 2021. He received a B.Sc. (Hons) from Bangalore University in 1972, a M.Sc. from IIT Madras in 1974 and a Ph.D. from University of Southern California in 1978 under the direction of George Olah, where he worked on characterizing stable carbocations in superacids. He also sits on several editorial boards of major scientific journals.

== Research ==
Dr. Prakash is a researcher with over 870 peer-reviewed publications that have been cited by over 60,900 times. and co-author of many edited books and monographs. He also holds ~120 patents and has been generating headlines as a co-proponent of the methanol economy concept alongside the late Nobel Laureate George Olah. He co-developed the Direct Methanol Fuel Cell (DMFC) with collaborators from NASA-JPL. He introduced and developed trifluoromethyltrimethylsilane as a trifluoromethylating reagent in organic chemistry, sometimes referred to as the Ruppert-Prakash reagent.

Prakash's current research interests cover a wide range of subjects in the area of selective fluorinations, fluoroalkylations, oxidations, energetic materials, reductions, stereoselective reactions, electrochemical synthesis, hydrocarbon activation and isomerization, anthropogenic CO_{2} based fuels and feed-stocks, direct oxidation fuel cells, lithium-ion battery electrolytes, iron batteries, flow batteries, electrochemistry, polymer chemistry, superacid catalyzed reactions, stable carbocation chemistry, application of ab initio and DFT theory and NMR chemical shift calculations. His coauthored book with G. A.Olah and A. Goeppert on solving the carbon conundrum, Beyond Oil and Gas: The Methanol Economy (translated into Chinese, Swedish, Hungarian, Japanese and Russian), Wiley VCH (published in three editions, 2006, 2009 and 2018) is getting increasing attention and adoption world-wide.

== Awards ==
Dr. Prakash has received many awards and accolades. He is a recipient of three American Chemical Society National Awards (2004, 2006, and 2018) and in 2011 was elected a fellow of the European Academy of Sciences for his contribution towards the methanol economy. He co-shared (with G. A. Olah) the $1M Samson Prime Minister's Prize for Innovation in Alternative Fuels for Transportation from the State of Israel in 2013. His work in fluorine chemistry was recognized by the Henri Moissan Prize from the Fondation de la Maison de la Chimie in France in 2015.

== List of major awards and recognition ==
- Phi Kappa Phi Faculty Recognition Award for Research and Scholarship, 1986
- USC Endowed Chair, George A. and Judith A. Olah Nobel Laureate Chair in Hydrocarbon Chemistry, 1/1/1997–present
- JPL/TAP Group Achievement Award for Low Crossover Membranes for Methanol Fuel Cells, 1998
- USC Associates Award For Creativity In Research And Scholarship, 2000
- American Chemical Society Award for Creative Work in Fluorine Chemistry, 2004
- NASA Space Act Board Award, New Fuels For Direct Oxidation Fuel Cells, 2004
- Corresponding Member, European Academy of Arts, Sciences and Humanities, 2004
- Fellow of the American Association of Advancement of Science, 2005
- American Chemical Society George A. Olah Award in Hydrocarbon or Petroleum Chemistry, 2006
- Richard C. Tolman Award, Southern California Section of American Chemical Society, 2006
- George A. Olah Annual Lecturer, University of Southern California, 2006
- Distinguished Alumnus Award, Indian Institute of Technology, Madras, India, 2007
- Professor K. Venkataraman Lecturer, University Department of Chemical Technology, University of Mumbai, India, 2008
- CRSI Medal, Chemical Research Society of India, 2010
- Burgenstock Lecturer, 2010
- Fellow of the European Academy of Sciences, 2012
- USC Raubenheimer Outstanding Senior Faculty Award, For Exemplary Contributions in the Areas of Teaching, Research and Service, 2011
- Mellon Mentoring Award (Postdoctoral), University of Southern California, 2012
- Eric and Sheila Samson Prime Minister's Prize for Alternative Fuels to Transportation from the State of Israel, 2013
- The National Academy of Sciences, India (NASI) Foreign Fellow, 2013
- Fellow of the American Chemical Society (ACS Fellow), 2014
- ASEI Scientist of the Year, Chemistry & Chemical Engineering, American Association of Engineers of Indian Origin, 2014
- Henri Moissan Prize for excellence in Fluorine Chemistry, Fondation de la Maison de la Chimie, 2015
- 19th Charles Reed Endowed Lecturer, Rensselaer Polytechnic Institute, 2016
- American Chemical Society Arthur C. Cope Late Scholars Award for excellence in Organic Chemistry, 2018
- Daneshy International Award on Energy Transition, E-CET USC Viterbi School of Engineering, University of Southern California, 2023
- Distinguished Professor of Chemistry, Chemical Engineering and Materials Science, University of Southern California, 2024
