= Ammoxidation =

Chemical process for producing nitriles from ammonia and oxygen

Acrylonitrile is produced on an industrial scale by the ammoxidation of propylene.

In organic chemistry, ammoxidation is a process for the production of nitriles (R−C≡N) using ammonia (NH_{3}) and oxygen (O_{2}). It is sometimes called the SOHIO process, acknowledging that ammoxidation was developed at Standard Oil of Ohio. The usual substrates are alkenes. Several million tons of acrylonitrile are produced in this way annually:

$$\ce{CH3CH=CH2  +  3/2 O2  +  NH3  ->  N#CCH=CH2  +  3 H2O}$$

== Scope ==
Ammoxidation of alkenes exploits the weak C-H bonds that are located in the allylic position of unsaturated hydrocarbons. Benzylic C-H bonds are also susceptible to ammoxidation, reflecting the weakness of their C-H bonds. Benzonitrile is produced from toluene, and phthalonitriles are produced from xylenes. The reaction represents a partial oxidation. Many byproducts are generated, but the feedstocks are often simple, which compensates for these losses. Additionally, some byproducts are useful or recyclable. For the production of acrylonitrile, byproducts include hydrogen cyanide, acrolein, and the solvent acetonitrile.

The reaction tolerates heteroatoms and substituents. Cyanopyridines (e.g. 3-cyanopyridine, the precursor to niacin) are produced from methylpyridines. 2- and 4-Chlorotoluene are converted to 2-chlorobenzonitrile and 4-chlorobenzonitrile, respectively.

Typical catalysts are the oxides of vanadium and molybdenum. The original catalyst discovered at Sohio was bismuth phosphomolybdate (BiPMo_{12}O_{40}). π-Allyl complexes are assumed as intermediates.

== Related processes ==
Instead of alkenes, alcohols and aldehydes are competent substrates:

$$\ce{O=CHCH=CH2 + 1/2 O2 + NH3 -> N#CCH=CH2 + 2 H2O}$$
$$\ce{HOCH2CH=CH2 + O2 + NH3  -> N#CCH=CH2 + 3 H2O}$$

These substrates are usually more expensive than the alkenes, so they are less common. The nitrile process is used industrially to produce nitriles from fatty acids:

$$\ce{RCOOH + NH3 -> RC#N + 2 H2O}$$

Hydrogen cyanide is prepared by an ammoxidation-like reaction of methane, the Andrussov oxidation:

$$\ce{CH4 + NH3 + 3/2 O2 -> HCN + 3 H2O}$$

== See also ==
- Hydroamination - addition of amines to alkenes
