= Fluoroethyl =

Functional group

Fluoroethyl is an organofluorine functional group in chemistry. Its chemical formulas are −CHFCH_{3} (1-fluoroethyl) and −CH_{2}CH_{2}F (2-fluoroethyl). The general formulas of a compound containing this group are R−CHFCH_{3} and R−CH_{2}CH_{2}F, where R stands for an organyl group. An example of a compound containing the fluoroethyl group is (2-fluoroethyl)benzene Ph−CH_{2}CH_{2}F, where Ph stands for phenyl.

== See also ==
- Trifluoromethyl
