= Trifluoroiodomethane (data page) =

Chemical data page

This page provides supplementary chemical data on trifluoroiodomethane.

== Material Safety Data Sheet ==
The handling of this chemical may incur notable safety precautions. It is highly recommend that you seek the Material Safety Datasheet (MSDS) for this chemical from a reliable source such as SIRI, and follow its directions.

== Structure and properties ==
Structure and properties
Index of refraction, n_{D}	1.379 at 42 °C
Abbe number	?
Dielectric constant, ε_{r}	? ε_{0} at ? °C
Bond strength	230 kJ/mol (C-I)
Bond length	?
Bond angle	?
Magnetic susceptibility	?
Electron affinity	150 ± 20 kJ/mol
Dipole moment	1.68 D
Ionization potential	10.23 eV

== Thermodynamic properties ==
Phase behavior
Triple point	? K (? °C), ? Pa
Critical point	396.44 K (123.29 °C), 3.953 MPa, 868 kg/m^{3}
Std enthalpy change of fusion, Δ_{fus}H^{~~o~~}	-589.11 kJ/mol
Std entropy change of fusion, Δ_{fus}S^{~~o~~}	? J/(mol·K)
Std enthalpy change of vaporization, Δ_{vap}H^{~~o~~}	22 kJ/mol
Std entropy change of vaporization, Δ_{vap}S^{~~o~~}	? J/(mol·K)
Solid properties
Std enthalpy change of formation, Δ_{f}H^{~~o~~}_{solid}	? kJ/mol
Standard molar entropy, S^{~~o~~}_{solid}	? J/(mol K)
Heat capacity, c_{p}	? J/(mol K)
Liquid properties
Std enthalpy change of formation, Δ_{f}H^{~~o~~}_{liquid}	? kJ/mol
Standard molar entropy, S^{~~o~~}_{liquid}	? J/(mol K)
Heat capacity, c_{p}	? J/(mol K)
Gas properties
Std enthalpy change of formation, Δ_{f}H^{~~o~~}_{gas}	-587.8 kJ/mol
Standard molar entropy, S^{~~o~~}_{gas}	307.62 J/(mol K)
Heat capacity, c_{p}	70.89 J/(mol K) at 25 °C

== Spectral data ==
UV-Vis
λ_{max}	? nm
Extinction coefficient, ε	?
IR
Major absorption bands	? cm^{−1}
NMR
Proton NMR
Carbon-13 NMR
Other NMR data
MS
Masses of main fragments

This box:
- Except where noted otherwise, data relate to Standard temperature and pressure.
- Reliability of data general note.
