= Dichlorotoluene =

Dichlorotoluenes are organochlorine compounds, in particular aryl chlorides, with the formula CH_{3}C_{6}H_{3}Cl_{2}. Six constitutional isomers exist, differing in the relative position of the two chlorine substituents around the ring. They are all colorless and lipophilic. The 3,5 isomer is a solid at room temperature, whereas the others are liquids.

Dichlorotoluenes
Isomer	2,3-Dichlorotoluene	2,4-Dichlorotoluene	2,5-Dichlorotoluene	2,6-Dichlorotoluene	3,4-Dichlorotoluene	3,5-Dichlorotoluene
CAS Registry Number	[32768-54-0]	[95-73-8]	[19398-61-9]	[118-69-4]	[95-75-0]	[25186-47-4]
Density (g/mL)	1.266, liquid	1.25, liquid	1.254, liquid	1.266, liquid	1.25, liquid	solid
Melting pt (°C)	5	−13	3.2	2.6	−14.7	25.1
Boiling pt (°C)	208.1	201	201	201	209	202

== Preparation and uses ==
Several dichlorotoluenes are prepared by treatment of toluene or monochlorotoluenes with chlorine in the presence of various Lewis acids. Purification is challenging because the individual isomers have similar properties. The 2,6 and 3,5 isomers do not form acceptably from toluene or chlorotoluenes, so these isomers are prepared by indirect methods. For example, 2,6-dichlorotoluene can be prepared by chlorination of 4-toluenesulfonyl chloride followed by desulfonation.

Some dichlorotoluenes are precursors to commercial pesticides. 2,4-Dichlorotoluene is the precursor to pyrifenox, butafenacil, and the pyrazole derivatives pyrazoxyfen and pyrazolynate. The 2,6 isomer is a precursor to dichlobenil (2,6-dichlorobenzonitrile). 3,5-Dichlorotoluene is used to prepare propyzamide.

== Related compounds ==
- Benzal chloride (α,α-dichlorotoluene)
- Trichlorotoluene
