= 2,6-Dichlorobenzonitrile =

- Skeletal formula

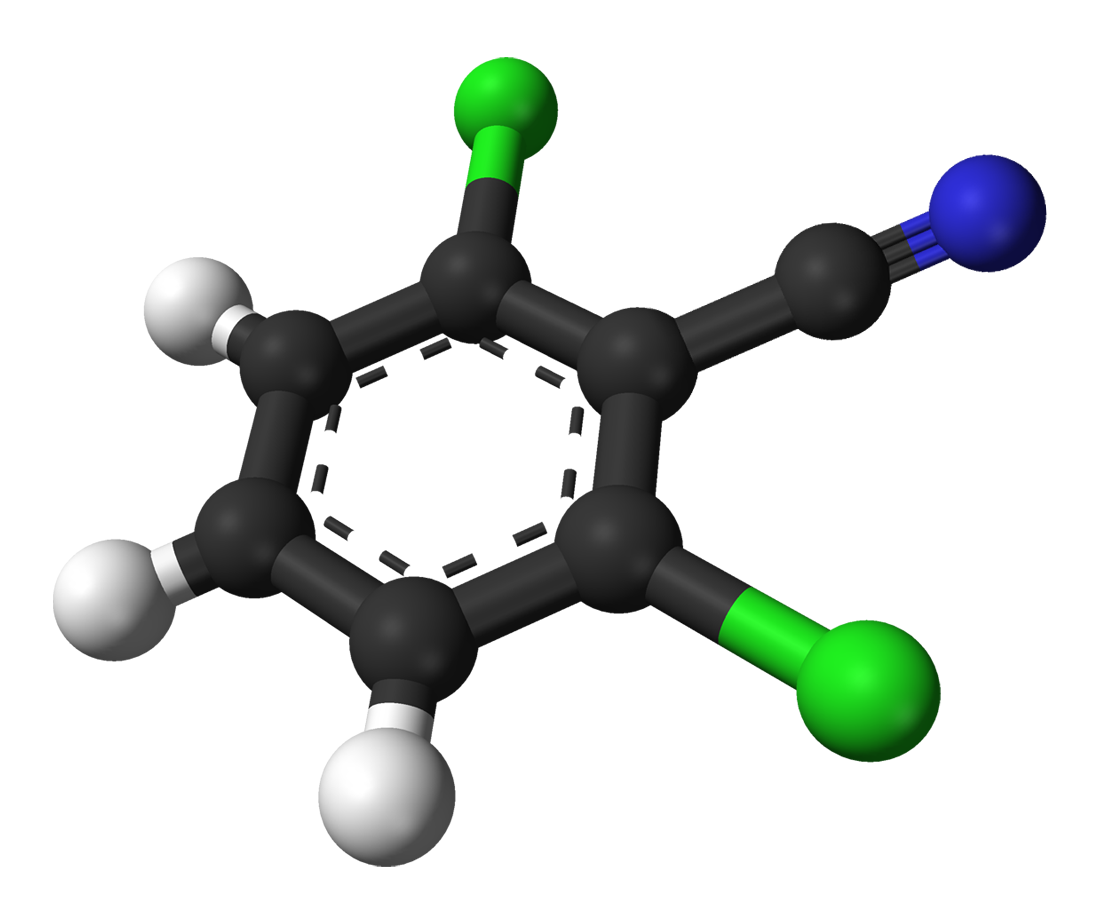
- Ball-and-stick model

Names
- Preferred IUPAC name 2,6-Dichlorobenzonitrile
- Other names Dichlobanil, Dichlobenil

Identifiers
CAS Number	1194-65-6
3D model (JSmol)	Interactive image
ChEBI	CHEBI:943
ChemSpider	2923
ECHA InfoCard	100.013.443
KEGG	C11040
PubChem CID	3031
UNII	N42NR4196R
CompTox Dashboard (EPA)	DTXSID5032365
- InChI: InChI=1S/C7H3Cl2N/c8-6-2-1-3-7(9)5(6)4-10/h1-3H Key: YOYAIZYFCNQIRF-UHFFFAOYSA-N; InChI=1/C7H3Cl2N/c8-6-2-1-3-7(9)5(6)4-10/h1-3H Key: YOYAIZYFCNQIRF-UHFFFAOYAG
- SMILES: N#Cc1c(Cl)cccc1Cl

Properties
Chemical formula	C_{7}H_{3}Cl_{2}N
Molar mass	172.01 g/mol
Appearance	white crystalline powder
Density	1.623 g/cm^{3}
Melting point	144.5 °C (292.1 °F; 417.6 K)
Boiling point	279 °C (534 °F; 552 K)
Solubility in water	insoluble

Hazards
Flash point	126 °C (259 °F; 399 K)
- Except where otherwise noted, data are given for materials in their standard state (at 25 °C [77 °F], 100 kPa). verify (what is ?) Infobox references

2,6-Dichlorobenzonitrile (DCBN or dichlobenil) is an organic compound with the chemical formula C_{6}H_{3}Cl_{2}CN. It is a white solid soluble in organic solvents. It is widely used as a herbicide and organic chemistry building block.

== Mechanism of action ==
It has herbicidal properties killing young seedlings of both monocot and dicot species. DCBN interferes with cellulose synthesis. DCBN adapted cell walls use minimal amounts of cellulose, instead relying on Ca^{2+}-bridge pectates.

Dichlobenil kills the roots of many species, but not all; further, the killing does not extend much beyond the portion actually soaked, according to the Californian department of agriculture in 1971.

== Application ==
In 1996, the University of California reported that "dosages were difficult to control... and as a result soaking or spraying methods are no longer used. ... The current application method involves applying metam-sodium products in foam carriers (similar to shaving cream)."

== Environmental behavior ==
It has low solubility, is not highly volatile and has potential to leach into groundwater. It is moderately persistent in soils and very persistent in water. It is moderately toxic to mammals, aquatic organisms, honeybees and earthworms.

Dichlobenil residue in water almost completely dissipates in 5 to 6 months.

The USDOE Bonneville Power Administration reported "high potential" for dichlobenil to enter groundwater.

=== Regulatory status ===
It is no longer approved for use within the EU, as of 2009.

The Inland Fisheries Ireland has reported "the registration of all dichlobenil products ... was revoked in Ireland from 18th March 2009, under Commission Decision 2008/754/EC of 18th September 2008. A period of grace for ... existing stocks expired on 18th March 2010." The London underground found itself in violation by using dichlobenil in September 2011.

=== Environmental toxicity ===
On an acute basis, dichlobenil is practically nontoxic to birds, mammals, honey bees; slightly to moderately toxic to aquatic invertebrates and estuarine organisms; and moderately toxic to fish. Dichlobenil is practically nontoxic to birds on a subacute dietary basis, but insufficient data are available to assess chronic avian toxicity. Dichlobenil is toxic to non-target terrestrial and aquatic plants. Dichlobenil may chronically affect fish at levels as low as 0.33 ppm and may chronically affect aquatic invertebrates at levels as low as 0.75 ppm. The dichlobenil degradate, BAM is slightly toxic to mammals and practically nontoxic to fish and aquatic invertebrates on an acute basis.

== Safety ==
Since 1995, the U.S. National Institutes of Health has warned about indoor usage: "Leave all windows open and fans operating... Put all pets outdoors, and take yourself any your family away from treated areas for at least the length of time prescribed on the label."

The UN IPCS reports dichlobenil can be absorbed into the body by inhalation, through skin and by ingestion, and that dispersion can create harmful concentrations in air quickly; dichlobenil may affect skin, possibly causing chloracne. Further, it warns dichlobenil is toxic to aquatic organisms, and does enter the environment under normal use, but great care should be taken to avoid release, e.g. through inappropriate disposal. The IPCS advises particulate filter respirators as PPE adapted to the air concentration of dichlobenil; spilled substance should be swept into covered sealable containers, moistened if needed to prevent dusting, and disposed of according to local regulations.

The U.S. Centers for Disease Control and Prevention (CDC) follows and cites the ICPS.

== Products ==
=== United States ===
These consumer products use dichlobenil as an active ingredient: "Oblitiroot", "Root Reach", "Foaming Root Killer" and "RootX". This is not an exhaustive list.

"Casoron" is dichlobenil sold agriculturally as a 50% wettable powder and as 4% granules.

== Synthesis ==
Dichlobenil is produced from 2,6-dichlorotoluene via the aldoxime.

A known use of dichlobenil is in the synthesis of hycanthone.
