= Trichlorotoluene =

Trichlorotoluenes are organochlorine compounds, in particular aryl chlorides, with the formula CH_{3}C_{6}H_{2}Cl_{3}. Six constitutional isomers exist, differing in the relative position of the three chlorine substituents around the ring. All isomers colorless and lipophilic solids.

Trichlorotoluenes
Name	2,3,4-Trichlorotoluene	2,3,5-Trichlorotoluene	2,3,6-Trichlorotoluene	2,4,5-Trichlorotoluene	2,4,6-Trichlorotoluene	3,4,5-Trichlorotoluene
Structure						
CAS Registry Number	[7359-72-0]	[56961-86-5]	[2077-46-5]	[6639-30-1]	[23749-65-7]	[21472-86-0]
Melting pt (°C)	42.9	44.65	42.95	79.95	32.0	44.85
Boiling pt (°C)	249.3	240.4	241.8	240.5	235.4	248.3

== Preparation and use ==
Four trichlorotoluenes—the 2,3,4-, 2,3,6-, 2,4,5-, and 2,4,6- isomers—are produced in significant yields by treatment of toluene with three equivalents of chlorine in the presence of various Lewis acids. These isomers result from the usual selectivity of electrophilic aromatic substitution reactions of substituted benzenes.

2,3,6-Trichlorotoluene is a precursor to 2,3,6-trichlorobenzoic acid (2,3,6-TBA), a commercial herbicide.

== Related compounds ==
- Dichlorotoluene
