= 1,3-Bis(trifluoromethyl)benzene =

Names
- Preferred IUPAC name 1,3-Bis(trifluoromethyl)benzene
- Other names α,α,α,α′,α′,α′-hexafluoro-m-xylene

Identifiers
CAS Number	402-31-3
3D model (JSmol)	Interactive image
ECHA InfoCard	100.006.310
EC Number	206-939-4
PubChem CID	223106
UNII	F7TWF66P6X
CompTox Dashboard (EPA)	DTXSID1059949
- InChI: InChI=1S/C8H4F6/c9-7(10,11)5-2-1-3-6(4-5)8(12,13)14/h1-4H Key: SJBBXFLOLUTGCW-UHFFFAOYSA-N
- SMILES: C1=CC(=CC(=C1)C(F)(F)F)C(F)(F)F

Properties
Chemical formula	C_{8}H_{4}F_{6}
Molar mass	214.110 g·mol^{−1}
Appearance	colorless liquid
Boiling point	114–116 °C (237–241 °F; 387–389 K)

Hazards
- GHS labelling
Pictograms	(GHS02: Flammable) (GHS07: Exclamation mark) (GHS09: Environmental hazard)
Signal word	Warning
Hazard statements	H226, H315, H319, H335, H411
Precautionary statements	P210, P233, P240, P241, P242, P243, P261, P264, P264+P265, P271, P273, P280, P302+P352, P303+P361+P353, P304+P340, P305+P351+P338, P319, P321, P332+P317, P337+P317, P362+P364, P370+P378, P391, P403+P233, P403+P235, P405, P501
- Except where otherwise noted, data are given for materials in their standard state (at 25 °C [77 °F], 100 kPa). Infobox references

1,3-Bis(trifluoromethyl)benzene is an organofluorine compound with the formula C_{6}H_{4}(CF_{3})_{2}. It is the most intensively studied of three isomers of the same formula. Like benzotrifluoride, bis(trifluoromethyl)benzene is prepared by the reaction of hydrogen fluoride with the corresponding trichloromethylbenzene compound:

C_{6}H_{4}(CCl_{3})_{2} + 6 HF → C_{6}H_{4}(CF_{3})_{2} + 6 HCl

1,3-Bis(trifluoromethyl)benzene undergoes bromination to give bromo-3,5-bis(trifluoromethyl)benzene (BrC_{6}H_{3}(CF_{3})_{2}), which is used to prepare other reagents, such as the sodium salt of tetrakis(3,5-bis(trifluoromethyl)phenyl)borate, NaBAr^{F}_{4}.
