= Fluometuron =

Names
- Preferred IUPAC name N,N-Dimethyl-N′-[3-(trifluoromethyl)phenyl]urea
- Other names 1,1-Dimethyl-3-[3-(trifluoromethyl)phenyl]urea; 1,1-Dimethyl-3-(α,α,α-trifluoro-m-tolyl)-urea; 3-(3-Trifluoromethylphenyl)-1,1-dimethylurea; 3-(m-Trifluoromethylphenyl)-1,1-dimethylurea; C 2059; Ciba 2059; Cotoran; Cotoran 85DF; Fluomethuron; Lanex; N-(3-Trifluoromethylphenyl)-N′,N′-Dimethylurea; N-(m-Trifluoromethylphenyl)-N′,N′-Dimethylurea; Pakhtaran

Identifiers
CAS Number	2164-17-2
3D model (JSmol)	Interactive image
ChEBI	CHEBI:82012
ChemSpider	15702
ECHA InfoCard	100.016.819
PubChem CID	16562
UNII	296378G1S8
CompTox Dashboard (EPA)	DTXSID8020628
- InChI: InChI=1S/C10H11F3N2O/c1-15(2)9(16)14-8-5-3-4-7(6-8)10(11,12)13/h3-6H,1-2H3,(H,14,16)
- SMILES: O=C(Nc1cc(ccc1)C(F)(F)F)N(C)C

Properties
Chemical formula	C_{10}H_{11}F_{3}N_{2}O
Molar mass	232.206 g·mol^{−1}
Density	1.39 g/cm^{3}
Melting point	163 to 164 °C (325 to 327 °F; 436 to 437 K)
Solubility in water	90 ppm (0.0105%) at 20 °C
- Except where otherwise noted, data are given for materials in their standard state (at 25 °C [77 °F], 100 kPa). Infobox references

Fluometuron is an herbicide. In the United States it was approved for use on cotton and sugarcane crops in 1974, but since 1986 is only approved for use on cotton.

Fluometron's herbicide resistance class is Group C, (Australia), C2 (global), Group 7, (numeric, i.e. Group 5, due to a merger). It is photosynthesis inhibitor.
