= Benzotrichloride =

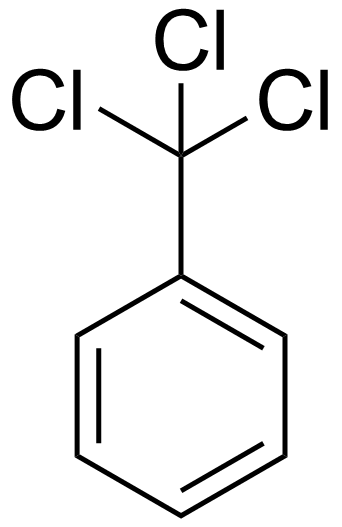

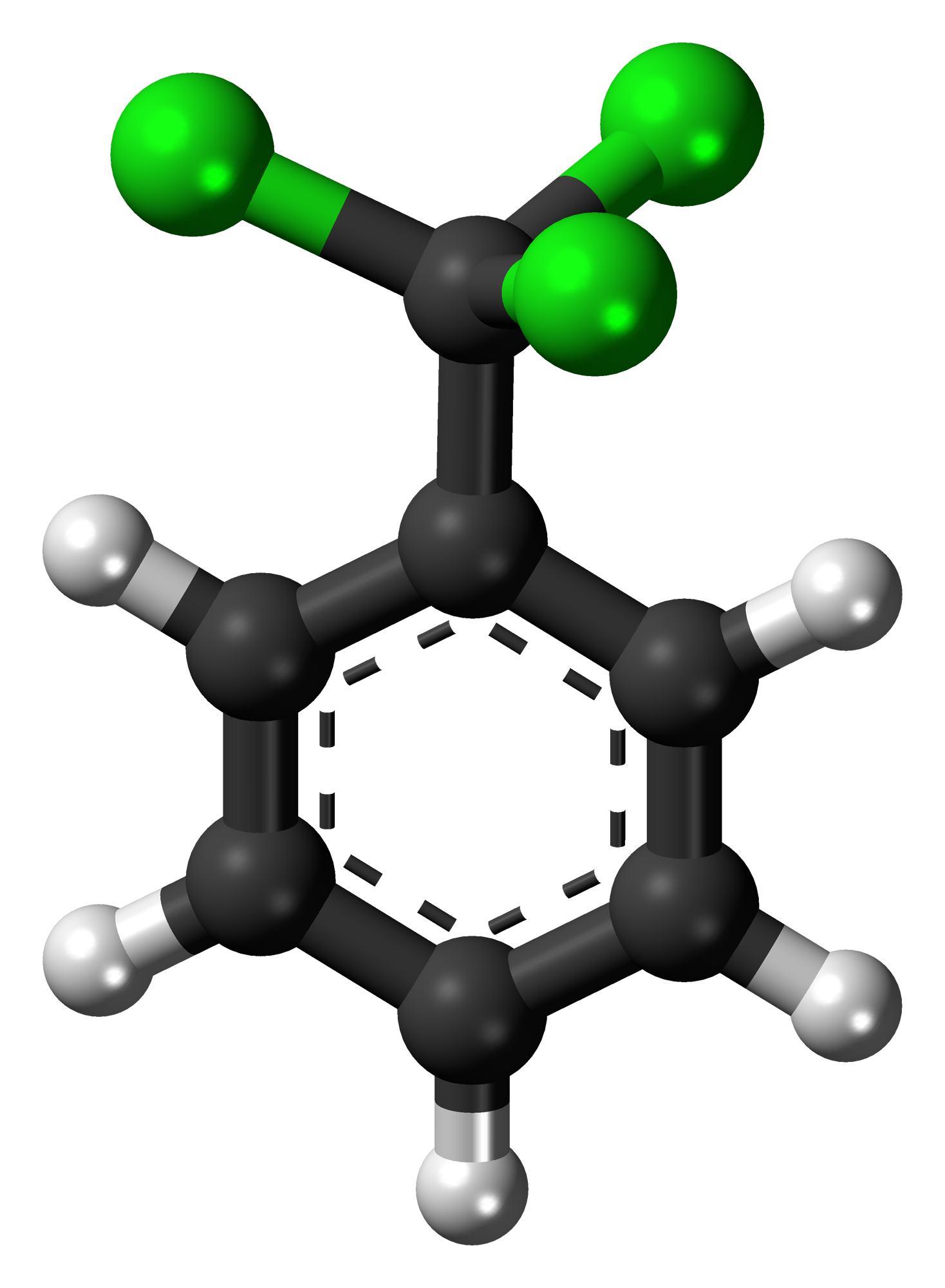

Names
- Preferred IUPAC name (Trichloromethyl)benzene
- Other names Toluene trichloride Phenyl chloroform α,α,α-Trichlorotoluene; PhCCl3

Identifiers
CAS Number	98-07-7
3D model (JSmol)	Interactive image
ChEBI	CHEBI:82274
ChEMBL	ChEMBL1347516
ChemSpider	13882366
ECHA InfoCard	100.002.395
EC Number	202-634-5
KEGG	C19166
PubChem CID	7367
RTECS number	XT9275000
UNII	U62VHG99AM
UN number	2226
CompTox Dashboard (EPA)	DTXSID1020148
- InChI: InChI=1S/C7H5Cl3/c8-7(9,10)6-4-2-1-3-5-6/h1-5H Key: XEMRAKSQROQPBR-UHFFFAOYSA-N
- SMILES: ClC(Cl)(Cl)c1ccccc1

Properties
Chemical formula	C_{7}H_{5}Cl_{3}
Molar mass	195.48
Appearance	Clear liquid
Odor	unpleasant
Density	1.3756 g/mL
Melting point	−5.0 °C (23.0 °F; 268.1 K)
Boiling point	220.8 °C (429.4 °F; 493.9 K)
Solubility in water	0.05g/L
Solubility	organic solvents

Hazards
- Occupational safety and health (OHS/OSH)
Main hazards	potential occupational carcinogen
- GHS labelling
Pictograms	(GHS05: Corrosive) (GHS06: Toxic) (GHS07: Exclamation mark) (GHS08: Health hazard)
Signal word	Danger
Hazard statements	H302, H305, H315, H318, H331, H335, H350
Precautionary statements	P201, P202, P261, P264, P270, P271, P280, P281, P301+P312, P302+P352, P304+P340, P305+P351+P338, P308+P313, P310, P311, P312, P321, P330, P332+P313, P362, P403+P233, P405, P501
NFPA 704 (fire diamond)	3 1 0
Flash point	97.22 °C (207.00 °F; 370.37 K)
Autoignition temperature	420 °C (788 °F; 693 K)
- Lethal dose or concentration (LD, LC)
LD_{50} (median dose)	120 mg/kg (in rats)
- Except where otherwise noted, data are given for materials in their standard state (at 25 °C [77 °F], 100 kPa). verify (what is ?) Infobox references

Benzotrichloride (BTC), also known as α,α,α-trichlorotoluene, phenyl chloroform or (trichloromethyl)benzene, is an organic compound with the formula C_{6}H_{5}CCl_{3}. Benzotrichloride is an unstable, colorless or somewhat yellowish, viscous, chlorinated hydrocarbon with a penetrating odor. Benzotrichloride is used extensively as a chemical intermediate for products of various classes, i.e. dyes and antimicrobial agents.

== Structure and reactivity ==
Benzotrichloride is a poorly water-soluble, clear to yellowish liquid with a penetrating odor. It hydrolyzes rapidly to benzoic acid and hydrochloric acid with a half life of about 2.4 minutes, thus making the compound unstable in the presence of water. In other chemical reactions, benzotrichloride reacts at the chlorinated α-carbon, for example in substitution reactions. It is used as an intermediate in the synthesis of benzoyl chloride, benzotrifluoride and 2,4-dihydroxybenzophenone which in turn are also intermediates in other reactions:

C_{6}H_{5}CCl_{3} + resorcinol → 2,4-dihydroxybenzophenone

C_{6}H_{5}CCl_{3} + H_{2}O → C_{6}H_{5}C(O)Cl + 2 HCl

C_{6}H_{5}CCl_{3} + 3 KF → C_{6}H_{5}CF_{3} + 3 KCl

These compounds are further used to synthesize chemicals needed in the pharmaceutical industry (benzoyl peroxide), the synthesis of pesticides, dyes and UV-absorbing compounds which are often used in paint and plastics to prevent degradation by sunlight.

== Production ==
Production capacity of benzotrichloride was estimated at 80,000 tonnes for the year 2000. It is produced by the free radical chlorination of toluene, catalysed by light or radical initiators such as dibenzoyl peroxide. Mono- and di-chlorinated intermediates are observed as benzyl chloride and benzal chloride:

C_{6}H_{5}CH_{3} + Cl_{2} → C_{6}H_{5}CH_{2}Cl + HCl
C_{6}H_{5}CH_{2}Cl + Cl_{2} → C_{6}H_{5}CHCl_{2} + HCl
C_{6}H_{5}CHCl_{2} + Cl_{2} → C_{6}H_{5}CCl_{3} + HCl

In the presence of Lewis acids, chlorination occurs at the ring, giving chlorotoluenes.

== Regulation ==
Benzotrichloride is classified as an extremely hazardous substance in the United States as defined in Section 302 of the U.S. Emergency Planning and Community Right-to-Know Act (42 U.S.C. 11002), and hence its use is subject to a list of reporting requirements by companies or institutions which synthesize, store or use it in large quantities. In 2018, EU member states have approved a European Commission proposal to restrict the use of carcinogenic, mutagenic and reprotoxic (CMR) substances in clothing, textiles and footwear. In 2015, the Commission published a preliminary list of 286 CMRs it proposed to restrict. Benzotrichloride was listed in this document as a toxic and carcinogenic compound.

According to the harmonised classification and labelling (CLP00) approved by the European Union (EU), this substance is toxic if inhaled, causes serious eye damage, may cause cancer, causes skin irritation, is harmful if swallowed, and may cause respiratory irritation.

== Metabolism ==
In a rat experiment with radiolabeled [14C]-benzotrichloride a single 40 mg/kg body weight dose was administered. The absorption half-life of BTC from the gastrointestinal tract was determined to be 3 hours. The concentration in the blood peaked at 4 h reaching 6.5 ppm, this decreased to 2.6 ppm after 24 h. The elimination of half-life in blood was 22 h. Elimination took place for 90% through urine and 10% through faeces. After 72 hours 1.5% of the dose was still present in tissue. The highest concentration levels were present in liver, kidney and fat.

BTC is rapidly metabolised via hydrolysis to benzoic acid and hydrochloric acid. This benzoic acid is first metabolized into benzoyl-CoA, which is metabolized into hippuric acid by replacing CoA with glycine. This hippuric acid is then excreted. 90% of the BTC was recovered from the rat urine as hippuric acid while small amounts of benzoic acid (0.7%) and phenyl acetic acid (0.8%) were also present. Four unidentified metabolites (5.5%) were also present in urine.

== Toxicity ==
=== Signs of toxicity ===
Several symptoms are related to the tested exposure to benzotrichloride (BTC) in rats: irritation of the eyes, the skin and the respiratory tract. Under occlusive conditions, rabbit skin which was exposed to BTC showed irritation. Next, severe eye irritation was reported in rabbits, after administering 0.1 mL of BTC. This eye irritation lasted up to 7 days. Finally, several rat studies into the acute toxic effects indicate that the respiratory system will be irritated after inhalation or oral uptake of BTC.

The effects of repeated inhalation, estimated with experiments on rats, include the following. BTC can lead to bronchitis and bronchopneumonia, depressed weight gain and gasping. Microscopically, inflammation and squamous metaplasia of the cells lining the nasal, tracheal, bronchial and bronchiolar epithelium can occur in rats. Histopathologically, an increased incidence of portal inflammatory cells infiltrate the liver and also bile duct proliferation is likely to occur.

The toxicity of BTC in mammals was assessed by Chu I. et al. (1984) by tracking several characteristics in rats for 28 days after oral intake of BTC. Growth rate and food consumption were not found to be affected by treatment. No deaths occurred during these trials.

=== Animal toxicity ===
==== Acute toxicity ====
===== Inhalation =====
Inhaling 1147 mg/m^{3} of benzotrichloride (BTC) for 3 hours resulted in 1 out of 6 male rats dying (after 3 days). On the other hand, inhaling 995 mg/m^{3} of BTC for 3 hours resulted in 4 out of 6 female rats dying within 13 days. However, reducing the duration of exposure to only one hour with a concentration just above 800 mg/m^{3} resulted in no male or female rats dying. The treated rats had irritated oral and ocular mucous membranes, while behaviour and breathing were altered for up to 13 days.

===== Dermal =====
Out of 10 female rats 1 died after being exposed to 5000 mg/kg body weight of BTC. This indicates that the median lethal dosage, the LD_{50} value, is higher than 5000 mg/kg body weight. The rats showed sedation starting from day 1 until day 8-10.

===== Oral =====
Studying 15 male and 15 female rats per dose group, after being given an oral dosage, an LD_{50} of 2188 mg/kg bodyweight and an LD_{50} of 1590 mg/kg bodyweight were found for males and females, respectively. Laboured breathing, polyuria, sanguineous urine, and reduced activity were observed, lasting from 15 minutes after ingestion until 7–9 days. The deceased rats had empty intestinal tracts and white-stippled stomachs. Moreover, pure compound administration resulted in a male LD_{50} of 1249 mg/kg body weight. Symptoms in these male rats included: bloody eyes, ataxia, cramps, diuresis, weight loss. Another study found an LD_{50} of 770 mg/kg (male) and 702 mg/kg (female) after administering these rats with benzoyl chloride in corn oil. Besides the same symptoms described earlier, upon necropsy lung congestion, thymus with red foci and yellow stained urogenital region and fluid filled intestines were found.

=== Repeated dose toxicity ===
==== Inhalation ====
The toxic effects of repeated benzotrichloride exposure have been assessed for inhalation, dermal exposure and oral ingestion. After repeated exposure to a concentration of 12.8 mg/m^{3} twice weekly for 30 minutes, over 12 months in mice, severe bronchitis and bronchial pneumonia were observed. After exposure of 5.1 mg/m^{3} for 6 hours a day, 5 days a week for 4 weeks, no adverse effects were observed in rats. Note that the exposure times resemble a 5-day work week (although with only 30 hours).

==== Dermal ====
After dermal administration in rabbits between 50 and 200 mg/kg bodyweight per day (5 days a week, 3 weeks) skin irritation up to necrosis was observed, suggesting that it is a dermal irritant.

==== Oral ====
After feeding rats 0.048–53 mg/kg body weight for 28 days, only mild microscopical liver kidney and thyroid structure change was observed, even at the lowest dose. The data presented in this study suggest that BTC possess a low order of oral toxicity in the rat.

=== Mutagenicity and carcinogenicity ===
==== Inhalation ====
Genotoxic potential was shown in bacteria and mammalian cell system, micronucleus formation occurred in bone marrow cells. Actual cancer incidence increase was clearly observed too: The same study finding bronchitis after long term respiratory use, found that 81% of mice had lung adenomas(8% in control), 27% skin adenomas (0% in control), 11% malignant lymphomas (0% in control). Similar studies also showed significant carcinogenicity. This shows that even though long-term inhalation damages the lungs, it also increases cancer risk, which is a risk needing stricter regulation.

==== Dermal ====
Dermal and oral studies all showed significant lung cancer increase, together with either significant skin cancer and stomach cancer increase respectively. Research, after suspicion of carcinogenicity in benzoyl-chloride producing factories, on ICR mice also showed significant incidence of tumors: skin-cancer (68%) and pulmonary tumors (58%) after applying 2.3 microliter/animal twice weekly for 50 weeks.

==== Oral ====
In humans only a few cases of lung cancer are linked to either benzoyl chloride or benzotrichloride, although smoking also might have played a role. Both NCI thesaurus and NPT carcinogen reports classify BTC as "reasonably anticipated to be a human carcinogen", based on limited evidence of carcinogenicity from studies in humans and sufficient evidence of carcinogenicity from studies in experimental animals.

==== Aquatic effects ====
Daphnia magna (a planktonic crustacean) were tested and a 24 h-EC_{50} of 50 mg/L was found. The toxic effects were attributed to HCl formation, as benzotrichloride dissociates rapidly into the far less toxic benzoic acid and HCl on water exposure. Compensating the pH decrease in water from the HCl negated toxic effects, suggesting that water acidification is the reason for the low aquatic life toxicity. Benzoic acid has an EC_{50} of >100 mg/L towards aquatic life, is readily biodegradable and does not accumulate, so is not regarded as toxic towards aquatic life.

=== Fertility ===
No extensive studies were done on fertility effects. As the carcinogenic potential on its own already warrants extensive restrictions, no additional restrictions are needed for effect on fertility, although the genotoxic properties suggest that fertility might be affected.

== Mechanism of toxicity ==
Part of the toxicity of benzotrichloride can be explained by its hydrolysis to benzoic acid, whose further metabolism can cause toxic effects. Benzoyl-CoA formation can deplete acetyl-CoA levels, hampering processes requiring acetyl-CoA, like gluconeogenesis via pyruvate carboxylase. Hepatic ATP levels are also lowered by 70-80%, at doses of 720–1440 mg/kg benzoic acid via intraperitoneal injection, by reducing acetyl-CoA availability for ATP production, which can have a wide range of consequences for affected cells. Ammonia toxicity can be amplified by benzoic acid, as it inhibits ureagenesis, reducing ammonia detoxification. Furthermore, benzoic acid can displace bilirubin from the albumins, posing a risk of bilirubin toxicity, as it diffuses into tissues.

Benzoic acid was shown to be genotoxic in vitro. Benzoic acid therefore might have a role in benzotrichloride carcinogenicity, but benzotrichloride has more carcinogenic potential than benzoic acid, suggesting that an intermediate in hydrolysis is responsible for at least part of the carcinogenicity. Research showed that the mutagenicity was not caused by reactive oxygen species (ROS) increase, but it did not elucidate what metabolite was the main carcinogen.
