= Trifluoromethyltrimethylsilane =

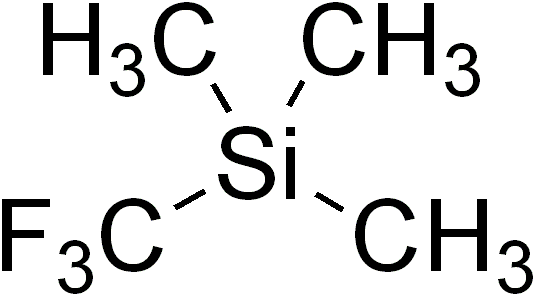

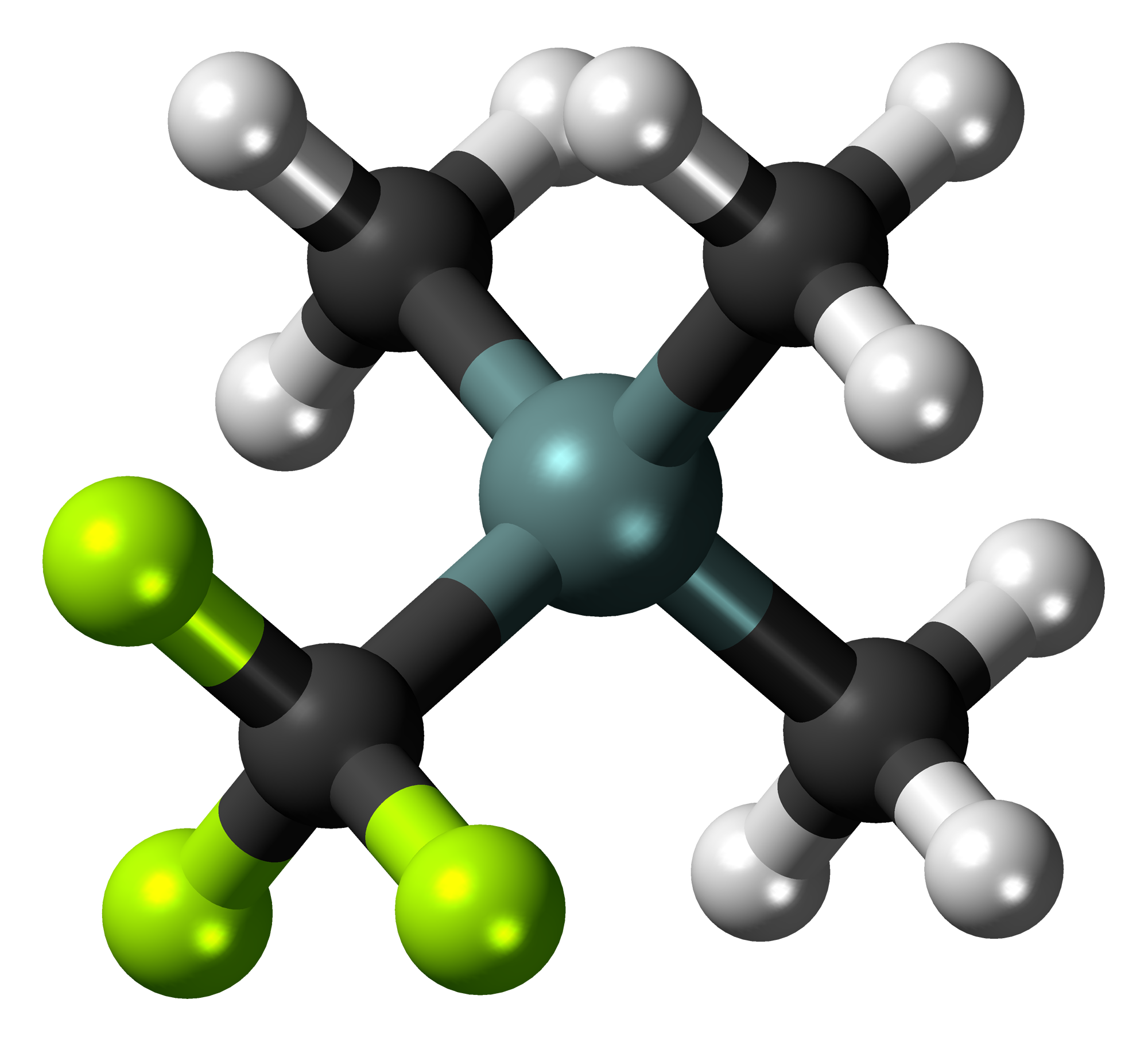

Names
- Preferred IUPAC name Trimethyl(trifluoromethyl)silane
- Other names Ruppert's reagent; TFMTMS; CF_{3}SiMe_{3}

Identifiers
CAS Number	81290-20-2
3D model (JSmol)	Interactive image
ChemSpider	480635
ECHA InfoCard	100.106.346
PubChem CID	552549
UNII	A009786QPJ
CompTox Dashboard (EPA)	DTXSID601336260 DTXSID20338998, DTXSID601336260
- InChI: InChI=1S/C4H9F3Si/c1-8(2,3)4(5,6)7/h1-3H3 Key: MWKJTNBSKNUMFN-UHFFFAOYSA-N
- SMILES: C[Si](C)(C)C(F)(F)F

Properties
Chemical formula	C_{4}H_{9}F_{3}Si
Molar mass	142.196 g·mol^{−1}
Appearance	Colorless liquid
Density	0.9626 g/cm^{3} at 20 °C
Boiling point	54 to 55 °C (129 to 131 °F; 327 to 328 K)
- Except where otherwise noted, data are given for materials in their standard state (at 25 °C [77 °F], 100 kPa). verify (what is ?) Infobox references

Trifluoromethyltrimethylsilane (known as Ruppert-Prakash reagent, TMSCF_{3}) is an organosilicon compound with the formula CF_{3}Si(CH_{3})_{3}. It is a colorless liquid. The compound is a reagent used in organic chemistry for the introduction of the trifluoromethyl group.

== History ==
The compound was first prepared in 1984 by Ingo Ruppert It was further developed as a reagent by G. K. Surya Prakash, who reported activation of TMSCF_{3} by fluoride to perform nucleophilic trifluoromethylation of carbonyl compounds. In the same year, Stahly described similar reactions for the synthesis of trifluoromethylated phenols and anilines. Since then TMSCF_{3} has been widely used as a nucleophilic trifluoromethylating agent. Potassium (trifluoromethyl)trimethoxyborate for this purpose has been synthesised from B(OMe)_{3}, CF_{3}SiMe_{3} and KF. Aryl functionalization by C-H activation has also been reported.

== Preparation ==
The reagent is prepared from trimethylsilyl chloride and bromotrifluoromethane in the presence of a phosphorus(III) reagent that serves as a halogen acceptor.

== Mechanism of action ==
In the presence of a metal salt (M^{+} X^{−}), the reagent reacts with aldehydes and ketones to give a trimethylsilyl ether, the net product of insertion of the carbonyl into the Si-CF_{3} bond. Hydrolysis gives trifluoromethyl methanols. The reagent also converts esters to trifluoromethyl ketones. A typical initiator is a soluble fluoride-containing species such as tetrabutylammonium fluoride; however, simple alkoxides such as KOtBu are also effective. The mechanism begins by generation of Si(CH_{3})_{3}X and a highly reactive [CF_{3}]^{−} (trifluoromethide) intermediate. The [CF_{3}]^{−} attacks the carbonyl to generate an alkoxide anion. The alkoxide is silylated by the reagent to give the overall addition product, plus [CF_{3}]^{−}, thus propagating an anionic chain reaction. The reagent competes with the carbonyl for the reactive intermediate, rapidly sequestering [CF_{3}]^{−} in a reversibly-generated -ate complex [(CF_{3})_{2}Si(CH_{3})_{3}]^{−}. This -ate complex is unable to react directly with the carbonyl, resulting in powerful inhibition of the chain reaction by the reagent. This inhibitory process is common to all anion-initiated reactions of the reagent, with the identity of the counter-cation (M^{+}) playing a major role in controlling the overall rate.

== Applications ==
One of the known uses of TMSCF3 is in the synthesis of Alpelisib.
