= Trifluorotoluene =

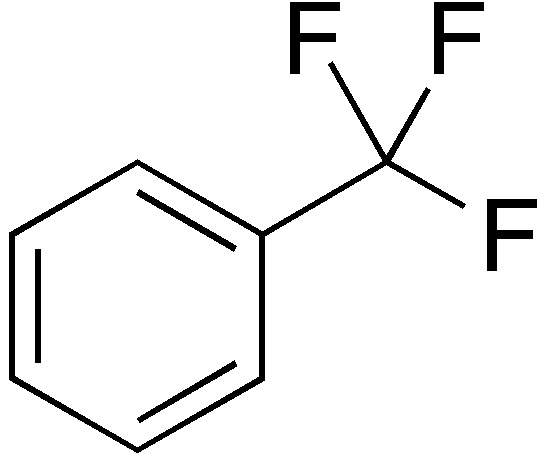

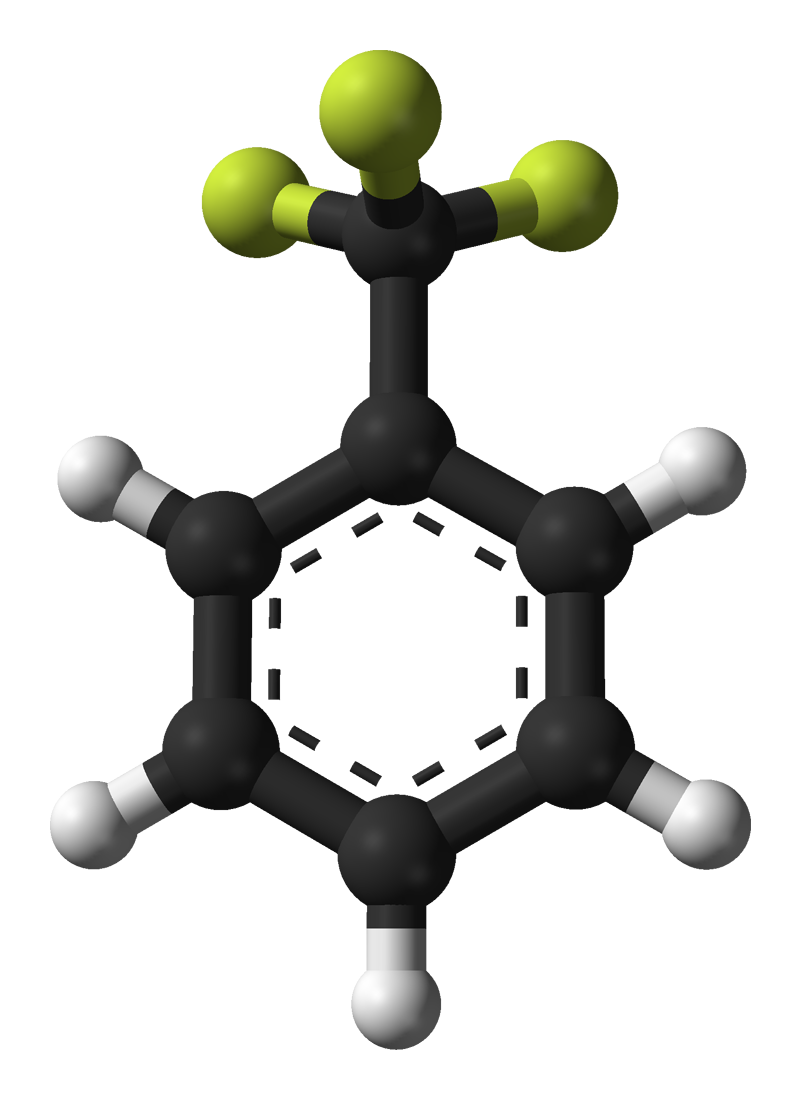

Names
- Preferred IUPAC name (Trifluoromethyl)benzene
- Other names Benzotrifluoride (BTF) α,α,α-Trifluorotoluene; CF3Ph; PhCF3; Phenylfluoroform

Identifiers
CAS Number	98-08-8
3D model (JSmol)	Interactive image
ChemSpider	7090
ECHA InfoCard	100.002.396
EC Number	202-635-0
PubChem CID	7368
UNII	49R6421K89
CompTox Dashboard (EPA)	DTXSID2024589
- InChI: InChI=1S/C7H5F3/c8-7(9,10)6-4-2-1-3-5-6/h1-5H Key: GETTZEONDQJALK-UHFFFAOYSA-N
- SMILES: C1=CC=C(C=C1)C(F)(F)F

Properties
Chemical formula	C_{7}H_{5}F_{3}
Molar mass	146.112 g·mol^{−1}
Appearance	colorless liquid
Odor	aromatic
Density	1.19 g/mL at 20 °C
Melting point	−29.05 °C (−20.29 °F; 244.10 K)
Boiling point	103.46 °C (218.23 °F; 376.61 K)
Solubility in water	<0.1 g/100 mL at 21 °C
Solubility	soluble in ether, benzene, ethanol, acetone miscible in n-heptane, CCl_{4}
Refractive index (n_{D})	1.41486 (13 °C)

Hazards
NFPA 704 (fire diamond)	0 3 0
Flash point	12 °C (54 °F; 285 K)
- Except where otherwise noted, data are given for materials in their standard state (at 25 °C [77 °F], 100 kPa). verify (what is ?) Infobox references

Trifluorotoluene is an organic compound with the formula of C_{7}H_{5}F_{3} or C_{6}H_{5}CF_{3}. This colorless fluorocarbon is used as a specialty solvent in organic synthesis and an intermediate in the production of pesticides and pharmaceuticals.

== Synthesis ==
Industrial production is done by reacting benzotrichloride with hydrogen fluoride in a pressurized reactor.

PhCCl_{3} + 3 HF → PhCF_{3} + 3 HCl

For small-scale laboratory preparations, trifluorotoluene can be synthesized by coupling an aromatic halide and trifluoromethyl iodide in the presence of a copper catalyst:

C_{6}H_{5}X + CF_{3}I + Cu → C_{6}H_{5}CF_{3} + CuXI (where X = I, Br)

== Uses ==
=== Solvent ===
According to Ogawa and Curran, trifluorotoluene is similar to dichloromethane in standard acylation, tosylation, and silylation reactions. The dielectric constants for dichloromethane and trifluorotoluene are 9.04 and 9.18, respectively, indicating similar solvating properties. Dipole moments compare less favorably: 1.89 and 2.86 D for dichloromethane and trifluorotoluene, respectively. Replacing dichloromethane is advantageous when conditions require higher boiling solvents, since trifluorotoluene boils at 103 °C it has a higher boiling point than dichloromethane, which has a boiling point of ~40 °C.

As a solvent, trifluorotoluene is useful in mild Lewis-acid catalyzed reactions, such as the Friedel-Crafts preparations. The most common catalyst, aluminium trichloride reacts with trifluorotoluene at room temperature; however, zinc chloride does not.

=== Synthetic intermediate ===
Trifluorotoluene is a precursor to related derivatives. Nitration gives 3-nitrotrifluorotoluene. Similarly, nitration of 2-chlorotrifluorotoluene gives 3-nitro-2-chlorotrifluorotoluene. The latter is a precursor to the herbicide Trifluralin. A derivative of trifluorotoluene, 3-aminobenzotrifluoride, is the precursor to the urea herbicide fluometuron. It is synthesized via nitration followed by reduction to meta-H_{2}NC_{6}H_{4}CF_{3}. This aniline is then converted to the final urea.

Flumetramide (6-[4-(trifluoromethyl)phenyl]morpholin-3-one), a skeletal muscle relaxant, is also prepared from trifluorotoluene.

Fluometuron is also made from phenylfluoroform.

== Analytics ==
Trifluorotoluene appears in ^{19}F NMR as a singlet at -63.2 ppm.
