= Benzal chloride =

Skeletal formula of benzal chloride
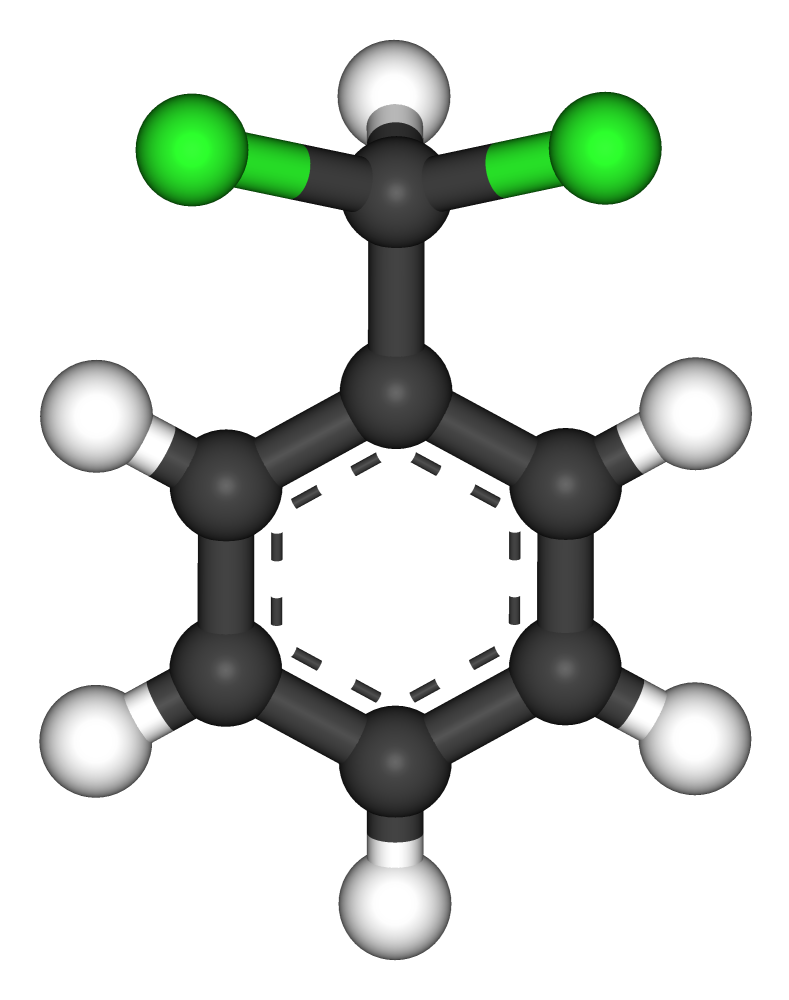
Ball-and-stick model of benzal chloride

Names
- Preferred IUPAC name (Dichloromethyl)benzene
- Other names: Benzyl dichloride; Benzylidene chloride; α,α-Dichlorotoluene; PhCl_{2}H

Identifiers
CAS Number	98-87-3
3D model (JSmol)	Interactive image
Beilstein Reference	1099407
ChEBI	CHEBI:82273
ChEMBL	ChEMBL1412576
ChemSpider	13882337
ECHA InfoCard	100.002.463
EC Number	249-854-8
KEGG	C19165
MeSH	Compounds Benzylidene Compounds
PubChem CID	7411
RTECS number	CZ5075000
UNII	222447TR16
UN number	1886 2810
CompTox Dashboard (EPA)	DTXSID6025014
- InChI: InChI=1S/C7H6Cl2/c8-7(9)6-4-2-1-3-5-6/h1-5,7H Key: CAHQGWAXKLQREW-UHFFFAOYSA-N
- SMILES: ClC(Cl)c1ccccc1; C1=CC=C(C=C1)C(Cl)Cl

Properties
Chemical formula	C_{7}H_{6}Cl_{2}
Molar mass	161.03 g·mol^{−1}
Appearance	Colorless liquid
Density	1.254 g/cm^{3}, liquid
Melting point	−17 to −15 °C (1 to 5 °F; 256 to 258 K)
Boiling point	205 °C (401 °F; 478 K) (82 °C at 10 mmHg)
Solubility in water	0.25 g/L at 39 °C
Vapor pressure	0.6 kPa (45 °C)

Hazards
- GHS labelling
Pictograms	(GHS03: Oxidizing) (GHS06: Toxic) (GHS07: Exclamation mark) (GHS08: Health hazard)
Signal word	Danger
Hazard statements	H302, H315, H318, H331, H335, H351
Precautionary statements	P201, P202, P261, P264, P270, P271, P280, P281, P301+P312, P302+P352, P304+P340, P305+P351+P338, P308+P313, P310, P311, P312, P321, P330, P332+P313, P362, P403+P233, P405, P501
Flash point	93 °C (199 °F; 366 K)
- Except where otherwise noted, data are given for materials in their standard state (at 25 °C [77 °F], 100 kPa). verify (what is ?) Infobox references

Benzal chloride is an organic compound with the formula C_{6}H_{5}CHCl_{2}. This colourless liquid is a lachrymator and is used as a building block in organic synthesis.

== Preparation and usage ==
Benzal chloride is produced by the free radical chlorination of toluene, being preceded in the process by benzyl chloride (C_{6}H_{5}CH_{2}Cl) and followed by benzotrichloride (C_{6}H_{5}CCl_{3}):

C_{6}H_{5}CH_{3} + Cl_{2} → C_{6}H_{5}CH_{2}Cl + HCl
C_{6}H_{5}CH_{2}Cl + Cl_{2} → C_{6}H_{5}CHCl_{2} + HCl
C_{6}H_{5}CHCl_{2} + Cl_{2} → C_{6}H_{5}CCl_{3} + HCl

Benzylic halides are typically strong alkylating agents, and for this reason benzal chloride is treated as a hazardous compound.

Treatment of benzal chloride with sodium gives stilbene.

The main industrial use is as a precursor to benzaldehyde. This conversion involves hydrolysis in the presence of base:

C_{6}H_{5}CHCl_{2} + H_{2}O → C_{6}H_{5}CHO + 2 HCl
