= Chlorotoluene =

Group of ortho, meta, para isomers

Chlorotoluenes are aryl chlorides based on toluene in which at least one aromatic hydrogen atom is replaced with a chlorine atom. They have the general formula C_{7}H_{8–n}Cl_{n}, where n = 1–5 is the number of chlorine atoms.

== Monochlorotoluene ==
Monochlorotoluenes are chlorotoluenes containing one chlorine atom. There are three isomers, each with the formula C_{7}H_{7}Cl.

=== Properties ===
The isomers differ in the location of the chlorine, but have the same chemical formula. All have very similar boiling points, although p-chlorotoluene has a much higher melting point due to a more tightly packed crystal structure.

Monochlorotoluene isomers
Common name	o-chlorotoluene	m-chlorotoluene	p-chlorotoluene
Structure
Systematic name	1-chloro-2-methylbenzene	1-chloro-3-methylbenzene	1-chloro-4-methylbenzene
Molecular formula	C_{7}H_{7}Cl (C_{6}H_{4}ClCH_{3})
Molar mass	126.586 g/mol
Appearance	colorless liquid
CAS number	[95-49-8]	[108-41-8]	[106-43-4]
Properties
Density and phase	1.073 g/ml, liquid	1.072 g/ml, liquid	1.069 g/ml, liquid
Solubility in water	practically insoluble
Other solubilities	Soluble in non-polar solvents such as aromatic hydrocarbons
Melting point	−35 °C (−31 °F; 238 K)	−47 °C (−52.6 °F; 226 K)	7 °C (44.6 °F; 280 K)
Boiling point	159 °C (318.2 °F; 432 K)	162 °C (323.6 °F; 435 K)	162 °C (323.6 °F; 435 K)
Magnetic susceptibility	−81.98·10^{−6} cm^{3}/mol	−80.07·10^{−6} cm^{3}/mol	−80.07·10^{−6} cm^{3}/mol

Benzyl chloride is an isomer, which has a chlorine substituted for one of the hydrogens of toluene's methyl group, and it is sometimes named α-chlorotoluene.

== Preparation ==
A laboratory route to 2- and 4-chlorotoluene proceeds from 2- and 4-toluidines (i.e. 2- and 4-aminotoluene). These compounds are diazotized followed by treatment with cuprous chloride. Industrially, the diazonium method is reserved for 3-chlorotoluene. The industrial route to 2- and 4-chlorotoluene entails direct reaction of toluene with chlorine. The more valuable 4-chlorotoluene is separated from 2-chlorotoluene by distillation. Distillation cannot be applied to separating 3-chlorotoluene from 4-chlorotoluene.

== Uses ==
2- and 4-chlorotoluene are precursors to the corresponding benzyl chloride (ClC_{6}H_{4}CH_{2}Cl), benzaldehyde (ClC_{6}H_{4}CHO), and benzoyl chloride (ClC_{6}H_{4}C(O)Cl). 2- and 4-chlorotoluenes are converted to 2-chlorobenzonitrile and 4-chlorobenzonitrile, respectively. Chlorotoluenes are precursors to dichlorotoluenes.

== See also ==
- Bromotoluene
- Iodotoluene
