= Trifluoroiodomethane =

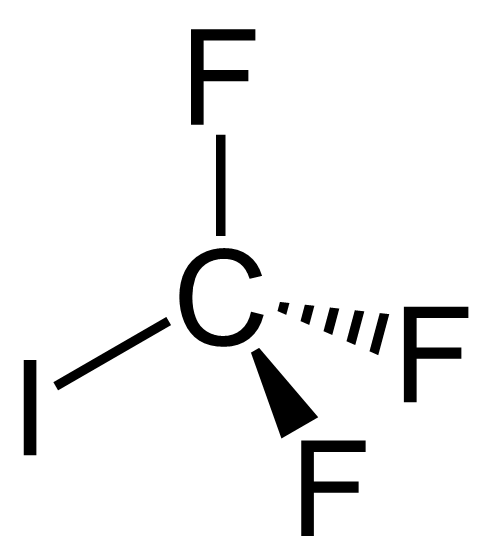

Names
- Preferred IUPAC name Trifluoro(iodo)methane
- Other names Trifluoroiodomethane; Iodotrifluoromethane; Monoiodotrifluoromethane; Trifluoromethyl iodide Perfluoromethyl iodide Freon 13T1

Identifiers
CAS Number	2314-97-8
3D model (JSmol)	Interactive image
ChemSpider	15962
ECHA InfoCard	100.017.286
EC Number	219-014-5
PubChem CID	16843
RTECS number	PB6975000
UNII	42A379KB0U
CompTox Dashboard (EPA)	DTXSID10882016 DTXSID2062325, DTXSID10882016
- InChI: InChI=1S/CF3I/c2-1(3,4)5 Key: VPAYJEUHKVESSD-UHFFFAOYSA-N; InChI=1/CF3I/c2-1(3,4)5
- SMILES: FC(F)(F)I

Properties
Chemical formula	CF_{3}I
Molar mass	195.91 g/mol
Appearance	Colorless odorless gas
Density	2.5485 g/cm^{3} at -78.5 °C; 2.3608 g/cm^{3} at -32.5 °C
Melting point	−110 °C (−166 °F; 163 K)
Boiling point	−22.5 °C (−8.5 °F; 250.7 K)
Solubility in water	Slightly
Vapor pressure	541 kPa

Hazards
- GHS labelling
Pictograms	(GHS08: Health hazard)
Signal word	Warning
Hazard statements	H341
Precautionary statements	P201, P202, P281, P308+P313, P405, P501

Supplementary data page
- Trifluoroiodomethane (data page)
- Except where otherwise noted, data are given for materials in their standard state (at 25 °C [77 °F], 100 kPa). verify (what is ?) Infobox references

Trifluoroiodomethane, also referred to as trifluoromethyl iodide is a halomethane with the formula CF_{3}I. It is an experimental alternative to Halon 1301 (CBrF_{3}) in unoccupied areas. It would be used as a gaseous fire suppression flooding agent for in-flight aircraft and electronic equipment fires.

== Chemistry ==
It is used in the rhodium-catalyzed α-trifluoromethylation of α,β-unsaturated ketones.

It can be used as a new generation fire extinguishing agent to replace Halon in fire protection systems. The mechanism of extinguishing fires for CF_{3}I is active and primarily based on interruption of the chain reaction in the combustion area of the flame by so-called "negative" catalytic action. It is also used as an eco-friendly insulation gas to replace SF_{6} in electrical power industry.

In the presence of sunlight or at temperatures above 100 °C it can react with water, forming hazardous by-products such as hydrogen fluoride (HF), hydrogen iodide (HI) and carbonyl fluoride (COF_{2}).

== Environmental effects ==
Trifluoroiodomethane contains carbon, fluorine, and iodine atoms. Although iodine is several hundred times more efficient at destroying stratospheric ozone than chlorine, experiments have shown that because the weak C-I bond breaks easily under the influence of water (owing to the electron-attracting fluorine atoms), trifluoroiodomethane has an ozone depleting potential less than one-thousandth that of Halon 1301 (0.008-0.01). Its atmospheric lifetime, at less than 1 month, is less than 1 percent that of Halon 1301, and less even than hydrogen chloride formed from volcanoes.

There is, however, still the problem of the C-F bonds absorbing in the atmospheric window. However, the IPCC has calculated the 100-year global warming potential of trifluoroiodomethane to be 0.4 (i.e., 40% of that of CO_{2}).
