= Fomesafen =

PPOi herbicide

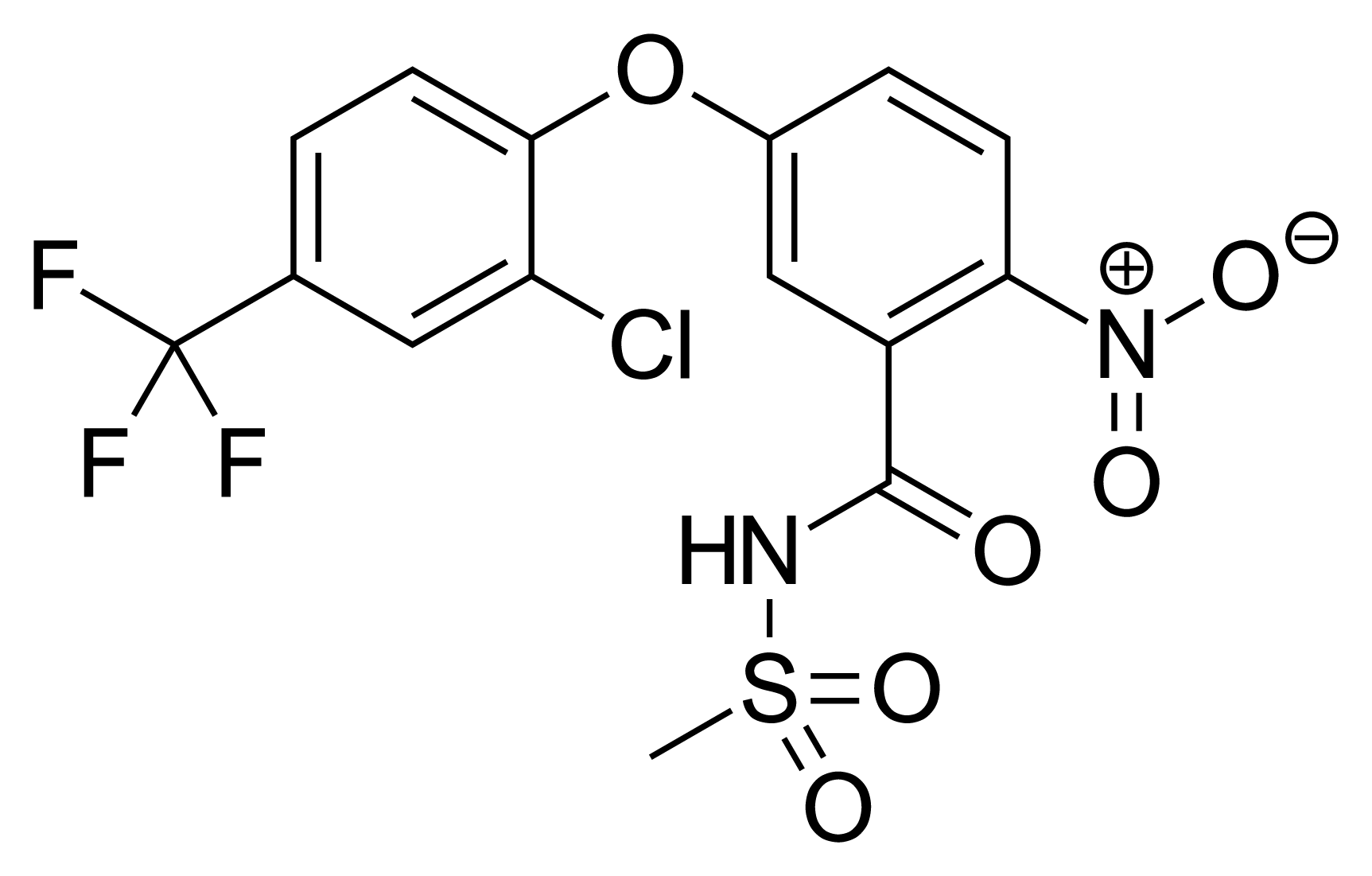

Names
- Preferred IUPAC name 5-[2-Chloro-4-(trifluoromethyl)phenoxy]-N-(methanesulfonyl)-2-nitrobenzamide

Identifiers
CAS Number	72178-02-0
3D model (JSmol)	Interactive image
ChEBI	CHEBI:81925
ChEMBL	ChEMBL1898629
ChemSpider	46694
ECHA InfoCard	100.069.470
EC Number	276-439-9
KEGG	C18736
PubChem CID	51556
UNII	M0A3U4CDTF
CompTox Dashboard (EPA)	DTXSID7024112
- InChI: InChI=1S/C15H10ClF3N2O6S/c1-28(25,26)20-14(22)10-7-9(3-4-12(10)21(23)24)27-13-5-2-8(6-11(13)16)15(17,18)19/h2-7H,1H3,(H,20,22) Key: BGZZWXTVIYUUEY-UHFFFAOYSA-N
- SMILES: CS(=O)(=O)NC(=O)C1=C(C=CC(=C1)OC2=C(C=C(C=C2)C(F)(F)F)Cl)[N+](=O)[O-]

Properties
Chemical formula	C_{15}H_{10}ClF_{3}N_{2}O_{6}S
Molar mass	438.76 g·mol^{−1}
Solubility in water	50 mg/L (20 °C)
log P	−1.2 (20 °C)
Acidity (pK_{a})	2.83

Hazards
- GHS labelling
Pictograms	(GHS07: Exclamation mark)
Signal word	Warning
Hazard statements	H302
Precautionary statements	P264, P270, P301+P312, P330, P501
- Except where otherwise noted, data are given for materials in their standard state (at 25 °C [77 °F], 100 kPa). Infobox references

Fomesafen is the ISO common name for an organic compound used as an herbicide. It acts by inhibiting the enzyme protoporphyrinogen oxidase (PPO) which is necessary for chlorophyll synthesis. Soybeans naturally have a high tolerance to fomesafen, via metabolic disposal by glutathione S-transferase. As a result, soy is the most common crop treated with fomesafen, followed by other beans and a few other crop types. It is not safe for maize/corn or other Poaceae.

== History ==
The nitrophenyl ethers are a well-known class of herbicides, the oldest member of which was nitrofen, invented by Rohm & Haas and first registered for sale in 1964. This area of chemistry became very competitive, with the Mobil Oil Corporation's filing in 1969 and grant in 1974 of a patent to the structural analog with a COOCH_{3} group adjacent to the nitro group of nitrofen. This product, bifenox, was launched with the brand name Mowdown in 1981. Meanwhile Rohm & Haas introduced acifluorfen (as its sodium salt with brand name Blazer) in 1980, having developed it under the code number RH-6201. It had much improved properties including a wider spectrum of herbicidal effect and good safety to soybean crops. The first patent for the material was published in December 1975, although an earlier Belgian patent published in September 1973 had described related chemistry.

Nitrofen

Bifenox

Acifluorfen

Chemists at the Imperial Chemical Industries (ICI) research site at Jealott's Hill, UK, investigated this area to attempt to find their own intellectual property and develop a proprietary material that could compete in the market. The idea which proved successful was to replace the carboxylic acid in acifluorfen with a group that could mimic it (by having similar pK_{a} and overall solubility, for example) but could not metabolise to acifluorfen and potentially infringe the competitor's patents. Patent filings on this invention, where the replacement for COOH was a CONHSO_{2}CH_{3} group were made in January 1978. Fomesafen was developed under the code number PP021 and first sales were in Argentina in 1983, with the brand name Flex.

== Synthesis ==
As described in the ICI patent, fomesafen can be made from acifluorfen by reaction with thionyl chloride to form the acid chloride and then with methanesulfonamide, in pyridine as solvent.

Ar-COOH + SOCl_{2} → ArCOCl
Ar-COCl + CH_{3}SO_{2}NH_{2} → ArCONHSO_{2}CH_{3}

== Mechanism of action ==
The detailed mechanism of action for fomesafen and related nitrophenyl ether herbicides was unknown at the time they were invented. The effects visible on whole plants are chlorosis and desiccation: several hypotheses were advanced regarding the molecular-level interactions which might explain these symptoms. The now-accepted explanation for the damage is that these compounds inhibit the enzyme protoporphyrinogen oxidase, which leads to an accumulation of protoporphyrin IX in the plant cells. This is a potent photosensitizer which activates oxygen, leading to lipid peroxidation. Both light and oxygen are required for this process to kill the plant.

== Usage ==
In the United States, the Environmental Protection Agency (EPA) is responsible for regulating pesticides under the Federal Insecticide, Fungicide, and Rodenticide Act (FIFRA), the Food Quality Protection Act (FQPA) and the Pesticide Registration Improvement Act (PRIA). A pesticide can only be used legally according to the directions on the label that is included at the time of the sale of the pesticide. The purpose of the label is "to provide clear directions for effective product performance while minimizing risks to human health and the environment". A label is a legally binding document that mandates how the pesticide can and must be used and failure to follow the label as written when using the pesticide is a federal offence.

Fomesafen is normally applied postemergence (when weeds are visible in the crop) but may also be used preemergence. It controls or suppresses broadleaf weeds, grasses and sedges in soybeans and is effective on a very wide range of weed species including Abutilon theophrasti, Acalypha ostryifolia, Acanthospermum hispidum, Amaranthus palmeri, Ambrosia artemisiifolia, Anoda cristata, Barbarea vulgaris, Brassica kaber, Calystegia sepium, Cannabis sativa, Cardiospermum halicacabum, Cassia obtusifolia, Chenopodium album, Citrullus vulgaris, Convolvulus arvensis, Croton glandulosus, Cucumis melo, Cyperus esculentus, Datura stramonium, Digitaria, Echinochloa crus-galli, Eleusine indica, Euphorbia heterophylla, Helianthus annuus, Hibiscus trionum, Ipomoea quamoclit, Melochia corchorifolia, Mollugo verticillata, Polygonum pensylvanicum, Portulaca oleracea, Richardia scabra, Sesbania exaltata, Setaria faberi, Solanum carolinense, Sorghum halepense, Striga asiatica and Xanthium strumarium. The product is typically used at application rates of 0.3 lb a.i. per acre.

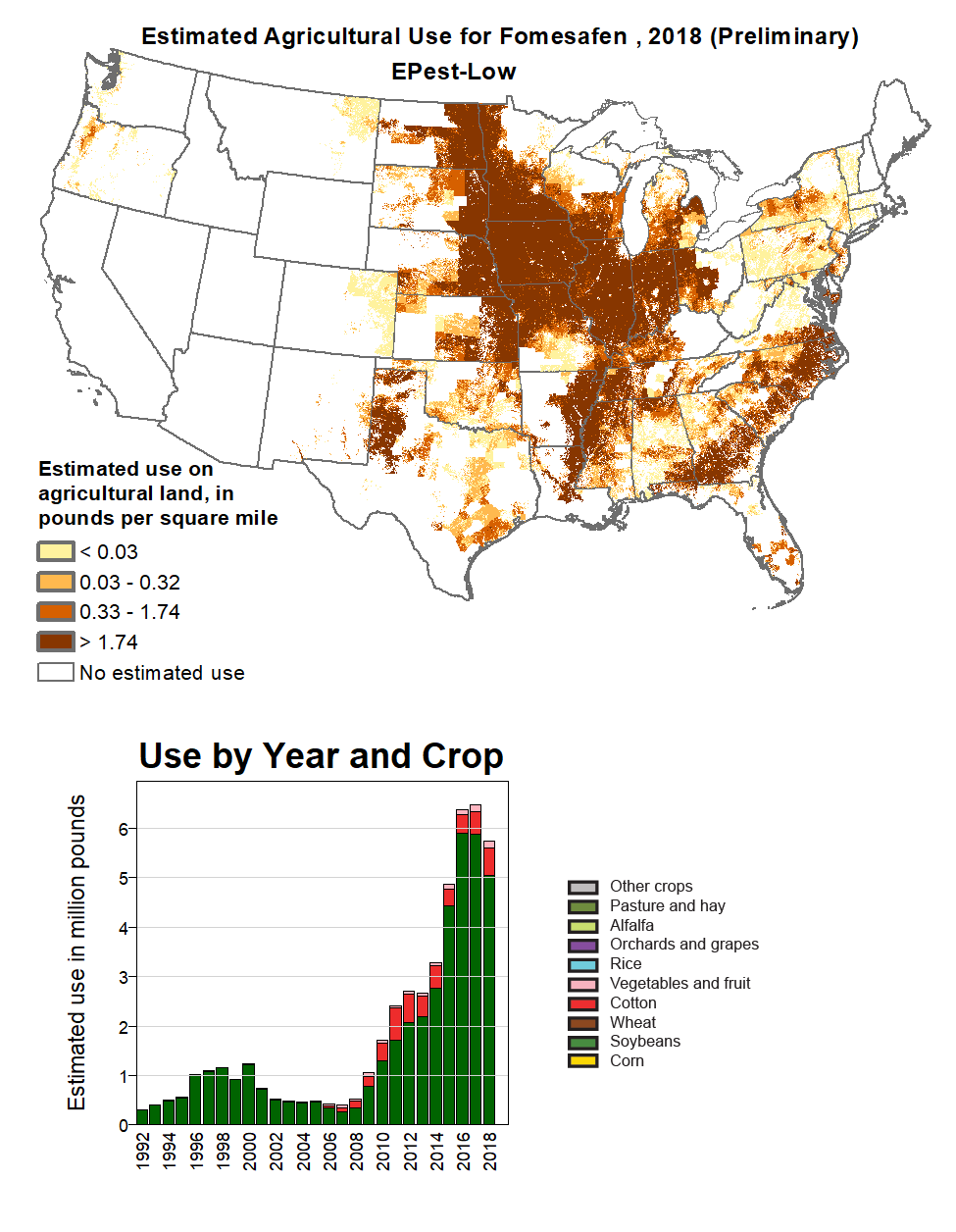
US Geological Survey estimate of fomesafen use in the USA to 2018

The estimated annual use of fomesafen in US agriculture is mapped by the US Geological Service and shows that in 2018, the latest date for which figures are available, approximately 6,000,000 pounds (2,700,000 kg) were applied — mainly in soybean. The compound is not registered for use in the European Union, although a closely related nitrophenyl ether, bifenox, is available there.

== Human safety ==
The LD_{50} of fomesafen is 1250 mg/kg (rats, oral), which means that it is moderately toxic by oral ingestion. The US Code of Federal Regulations records the maximum residue tolerances for fomesafen in various food products.

== Effects on the environment ==
The environmental fate and ecotoxicology of fomesafen are summarised in the Pesticide Properties database The compound was used in a case study that developed methods for conducting nationwide endangered species assessments in the USA.

== Resistance ==
Resistance to fomesafen has developed including in Amaranthus retroflexus in Northeast China, Amaranthus palmeri in Arkansas, and Euphorbia heterophylla in Brazil.
