= Acifluorfen =

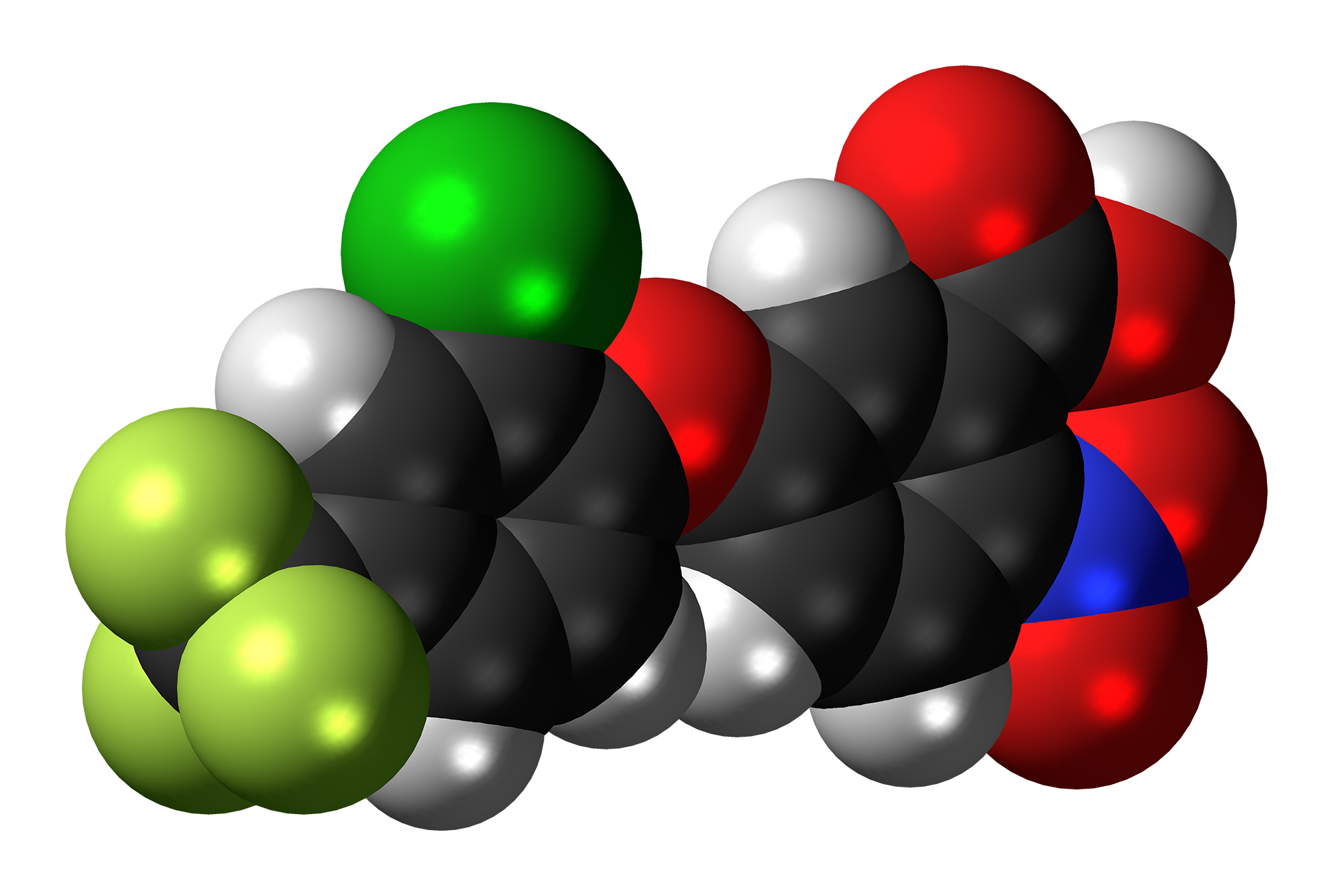

Names
- Preferred IUPAC name 5-[2-Chloro-4-(trifluoromethyl)phenoxy]-2-nitrobenzoic acid

Identifiers
- Compounds; Acid: Acifluorfen; Na^{+} salt: Acifluorfen sodium
CAS Number	Acid: 50594-66-6; Na^{+} salt: 62476-59-9
3D model (JSmol)	Acid: Interactive image
ChEBI	Acid: CHEBI:73172
ChEMBL	Acid: ChEMBL222440
ChemSpider	Acid: 40113; Na^{+} salt: 40112
DrugBank	Acid: DB07338
ECHA InfoCard	100.051.468
PubChem CID	Acid: 44073; Na^{+} salt: 44072
UNII	Acid: OI60IB203A; Na^{+} salt: 6H07I1G902
CompTox Dashboard (EPA)	Acid: DTXSID0020022
- InChI: InChI=1S/C14H7ClF3NO5/c15-10-5-7(14(16,17)18)1-4-12(10)24-8-2-3-11(19(22)23)9(6-8)13(20)21/h1-6H,(H,20,21) Key: NUFNQYOELLVIPL-UHFFFAOYSA-N; Na^{+} salt: InChI=1S/C14H7ClF3NO5.Na/c15-10-5-7(14(16,17)18)1-4-12(10)24-8-2-3-11(19(22)23)9(6-8)13(20)21;/h1-6H,(H,20,21);/q;+1/p-1 Key: RVULBHWZFCBODE-UHFFFAOYSA-M
- SMILES: Acid: Clc2cc(ccc2Oc1cc(C(=O)O)c([N+]([O-])=O)cc1)C(F)(F)F

Properties
Chemical formula	C_{14}H_{7}ClF_{3}NO_{5}
Molar mass	361.66 g·mol^{−1}
Density	1.573 g/mL
Melting point	155 °C
Solubility in water	250 g/L (20 °C)
log P	1.18 (20 °C)
Acidity (pK_{a})	3.86

Pharmacology
Legal status	AU: S6 (Poison)
- Except where otherwise noted, data are given for materials in their standard state (at 25 °C [77 °F], 100 kPa). Infobox references

Acifluorfen is the ISO common name for an organic compound used as an herbicide. It acts by inhibiting the enzyme protoporphyrinogen oxidase which is necessary for chlorophyll synthesis. Soybeans naturally have a high tolerance to acifluorfen and its salts, via metabolic disposal by glutathione S-transferase. It is effective against broadleaf weeds and grasses and is used agriculturally on fields growing soybeans, peanuts, peas, and rice.

== History ==
The nitrophenyl ethers are a well-known class of herbicides, the oldest member of which was nitrofen, invented by Rohm & Haas and first registered for sale in 1964. This area of chemistry became very competitive, with the Mobil Oil Corporation's filing in 1969 and grant in 1974 of a patent to the structural analog with a COOCH_{3} group adjacent to the nitro group of nitrofen. This product, bifenox, was launched with the brand name Mowdown in 1981. Meanwhile, Rohm & Haas introduced acifluorfen (as its sodium salt with brand name Blazer) in 1980, having developed it under the code number RH-6201. It had much improved properties including a wider spectrum of herbicidal effect and good safety to soybean crops. The first patent for the material was published in December 1975, although an earlier Belgian patent published in September 1973 had described related chemistry.

== Synthesis ==
The preparation of acifluorfen first described in the Rohm & Haas patent includes as its final steps an Ullmann condensation between 2-chloro-4-trifluoromethylphenol and 2-nitro-5-fluorobenzonitrile. The intermediate is then hydrolysed using hydrobromic acid in acetic acid as solvent.

== Mechanism of action ==
The detailed mechanism of action for nitrofen, acifluorfen and related diphenyl ether herbicides such as fomesafen was unknown at the time they were invented. The effects visible on whole plants are chlorosis and desiccation: several hypotheses were advanced regarding the molecular-level interactions which might explain these symptoms. The now-accepted explanation for the damage is that these compounds inhibit the enzyme protoporphyrinogen oxidase, which leads to an accumulation of protoporphyrin IX in the plant cells. This is a potent photosensitizer which activates oxygen, leading to lipid peroxidation. Both light and oxygen are required for this process to kill the plant.

== Usage ==
In the United States, the Environmental Protection Agency (EPA) is responsible for regulating pesticides under the Federal Insecticide, Fungicide, and Rodenticide Act (FIFRA), the Food Quality Protection Act (FQPA) and the Pesticide Registration Improvement Act (PRIA). A pesticide can only be used legally according to the directions on the label that is included at the time of the sale of the pesticide. The purpose of the label is "to provide clear directions for effective product performance while minimizing risks to human health and the environment". A label is a legally binding document that mandates how the pesticide can and must be used and failure to follow the label as written when using the pesticide is a federal offence.

Acifluorfen sodium is normally applied postemergence (when weeds are visible in the crop). It controls or suppresses broadleaf weeds, grasses and sedges and is effective on a very wide range of species including Abutilon theophrasti, Acalypha ostryifolia, Acanthospermum hispidum, Amaranthus palmeri, Ambrosia artemisiifolia, Anoda cristata, Barbarea vulgaris, Brassica kaber, Calystegia sepium, Cannabis sativa, Cardiospermum halicacabum, Cassia obtusifolia, Chenopodium album, Citrullus lanatus, Convolvulus arvensis, Croton glandulosus, Cyperus esculentus, Datura stramonium, Digitaria, Echinochloa crus-galli, Eleusine indica, Euphorbia heterophylla, Helianthus annuus, Hibiscus trionum, Ipomoea quamoclit, Melochia corchorifolia, Mollugo verticillata, Polygonum convolvulus, Portulaca oleracea, Richardia scabra, Sesbania exaltata, Setaria faberi, Solanum rostratum, Sorghum halepense, Striga asiatica and Xanthium strumarium. The product is typically used at application rates of 0.375 lb a.i. per acre.

The estimated annual use of acifluorfen in US agriculture is mapped by the US Geological Service and shows that as of 2018 approximately 550,000 pounds (250,000 kg) were applied — mainly in soybean. The compound is not registered for use in the European Union, although a closely related nitrophenyl ether, bifenox, is available there.

== Safety ==
In California, acifluorfen is listed as "known to the state to cause cancer or reproductive toxicity" according to Proposition 65.

== See also ==
- Lactofen, an ester derivative also used as an herbicide.
