= Aclonifen =

Names
- IUPAC name 2-chloro-6-nitro-3-phenoxyaniline
- Other names RPA099795

Identifiers
CAS Number	74070-46-5
3D model (JSmol)	Interactive image
ChEBI	CHEBI:137374
ChEMBL	ChEMBL1485557
ChemSpider	83411
ECHA InfoCard	100.070.619
EC Number	277-704-1
PubChem CID	92389
UNII	1762RDA835
CompTox Dashboard (EPA)	DTXSID7058175
- InChI: InChI=1S/C12H9ClN2O3/c13-11-10(18-8-4-2-1-3-5-8)7-6-9(12(11)14)15(16)17/h1-7H,14H2 Key: DDBMQDADIHOWIC-UHFFFAOYSA-N
- SMILES: Nc1c([N+](=O)[O-])ccc(Oc2ccccc2)c1Cl

Properties
Chemical formula	C_{12}H_{9}ClN_{2}O_{3}
Molar mass	264.67 g·mol^{−1}
Density	1.46 g/cm^{3}
Melting point	81.2 °C (178.2 °F; 354.3 K)
Solubility in water	1.4 mg/L (20 °C)
log P	4.37
Acidity (pK_{a})	−3.15

Pharmacology
Legal status	AU: S6 (Poison)

Hazards
- GHS labelling
Pictograms	(GHS07: Exclamation mark) (GHS08: Health hazard) (GHS09: Environmental hazard)
Signal word	Warning
Hazard statements	H317, H351, H410
Precautionary statements	P201, P202, P261, P272, P273, P280, P281, P302+P352, P308+P313, P321, P333+P313, P363, P391, P405, P501
- Except where otherwise noted, data are given for materials in their standard state (at 25 °C [77 °F], 100 kPa). Infobox references

Aclonifen is a diphenyl ether herbicide which has been used in agriculture since the 1980s. Its mode of action has been uncertain, with evidence suggesting it might interfere with carotenoid biosynthesis or inhibit the enzyme protoporphyrinogen oxidase (PPO). Both mechanisms could result in the observed whole-plant effect of bleaching (removal of leaf colour) and the compound includes chemical features (a nitro group attached to a diphenyl ether) that are known to result in PPO effects, as seen with acifluorfen, for example. In 2020, further research revealed that aclonifen has a different and novel mode of action, targeting solanesyl diphosphate synthase which would also cause bleaching.

== History ==
The nitrophenyl ethers are a well-known class of herbicides, the oldest member of which was nitrofen, invented by Rohm & Haas and first registered for sale in 1964. This area of chemistry became very competitive, with the Mobil Oil Corporation's filing in 1969 and grant in 1974 of a patent to the structural analog with a COOCH_{3} group adjacent to the nitro group of nitrofen. This product, bifenox, was launched in 1981. Meanwhile, Rohm & Haas introduced acifluorfen (as its sodium salt) in 1980. It had much improved properties including a wider spectrum of herbicidal effect and good safety to soybean crops. The first patent for this material was published in December 1975,

Nitrofen

Bifenox

Acifluorfen

Celamerck scientists were also working on analogs retaining the 4-nitrodiphenyl ether framework and in 1978 filed a patent of relatively narrow scope which claimed compounds having an amine group adjacent to the nitro substituent and also having an additional chlorine atom between the amine and the oxygen of the diphenyl ether. 2-Chloro-3-phenoxy-6-nitroaniline was described as having selectivity, so that important grassy weeds could be controlled within dicot crops and this lack of damage to the crop extended to some cereals. Aclonifen was subsequently developed and marketed by Rhône-Poulenc under the code number RPA099795 and launched in 1983 in Europe.

== Synthesis ==
The synthesis of aclonifen

The preparation of aclonifen first described in Celamerck patents starts from 2,3,4-trichloronitrobenzene. This is reacted in an autoclave with ammonia in dimethyl sulfoxide. The intermediate aniline is treated with potassium phenolate in an Ullmann ether synthesis using acetonitrile as solvent.

== Mechanism of action ==
The detailed mechanism of action for nitro diphenyl ether herbicides such as acifluorfen was unknown at the time they were invented. The effects visible on whole plants are chlorosis and desiccation: in 1983 several hypotheses were advanced regarding the molecular-level interactions which might explain these symptoms. By 1992, it was becoming clear that most compounds of this class inhibit the enzyme protoporphyrinogen oxidase (PPO), which leads to an accumulation of protoporphyrin IX in the plant cells. This is a potent photosensitizer which activates oxygen, leading to lipid peroxidation. Both light and oxygen are required for this process to kill the plant.

Aclonifen was shown to be an inhibitor of PPO but in addition had effects on carotenoid synthesis, by inhibition of phytoene desaturase at similar concentrations in vitro. This led to the conclusion that it expressed a dual mode of action. In 2020, further research revealed that it is likely to have a completely different and novel mode of action, targeting solanesyl diphosphate synthase. This has led to its being classified in its own group (HRAC classification Group 32) for the purposes of resistance management.

== Uses ==
Aclonifen is registered for use in the European Union, where a two-tiered approach is used for approval and authorisation. Before a formulated product can be developed for market, the active substance must be approved. Then authorisation for the specific product must be sought from every Member State that the applicant wants to sell it to. Afterwards, there is a monitoring programme to make sure the pesticide residues in food are below the limits set by the European Food Safety Authority. The active ingredient is registered for use against weeds in crops including cereals, potato and sunflower. It is particularly safe to sunflower, owing to the metabolism which occurs in that crop.

Aclonifen is now supplied by Bayer Crop Science under a variety of brand names according to the crop and formulation. For example, Proclus is used in winter wheat and Emerger in potatoes. It is normally applied pre-emergence (before weeds are visible in the crop) and controls or suppresses species including Alopecurus myosuroides, Anthemis cotula, Chenopodium album, Fallopia convolvulus, Galium aparine and Viola arvensis when used at application rates of 600 g a.i. per hectare.

In the UK, following the withdrawal of linuron in 2017, aclonifen began to be used as a pre-emergence herbicide in potatoes.
