= 4-(2,4-Dichlorophenoxy)aniline =

Identifiers
| CAS Number | 14861-17-7 |
| 3D model (JSmol) | Interactive image |
| ChemSpider | 25088 |
| ECHA InfoCard | 100.035.378 |
| EC Number | 238-932-7 |
| PubChem CID | 26940 |
| UNII | R41F3KF27M |
| CompTox Dashboard (EPA) | DTXSID3065825 |
- InChI: InChI=1S/C12H9Cl2NO/c13-8-1-6-12(11(14)7-8)16-10-4-2-9(15)3-5-10/h1-7H,15H2 Key: RWDOREOERSVIRK-UHFFFAOYSA-N
- SMILES: C1=CC(=CC=C1N)OC2=C(C=C(C=C2)Cl)Cl

Properties
| Chemical formula | C_{12}H_{9}Cl_{2}NO |
| Molar mass | 254.11 g·mol^{−1} |
- Except where otherwise noted, data are given for materials in their standard state (at 25 °C [77 °F], 100 kPa). Infobox references

4-(2,4-Dichlorophenoxy)aniline is a chemical compound belonging to the substance group of diphenyl ethers.

== Representation and synthesis ==
4-(2,4-Dichlorophenoxy)aniline is obtained by catalytic reduction of nitrofen (nitrofen).

== Occurrence ==
Approximately 15% of 4-(2,4-dichlorophenoxy)aniline is formed as a secondary degradation product during the metabolism of the herbicide nitrofen in rats via reduction of the nitro group. Further degradation occurs either to 4-(4-aminophenoxy)-2,5-dichlorophenol through ring hydroxylation or to 4-(2,4-dichlorophenoxy)acetanilide via acetylation.

== Use ==
4-(2,4-Dichlorophenoxy)aniline serves as an intermediate in the production of the pesticide diclofop-methyl.
