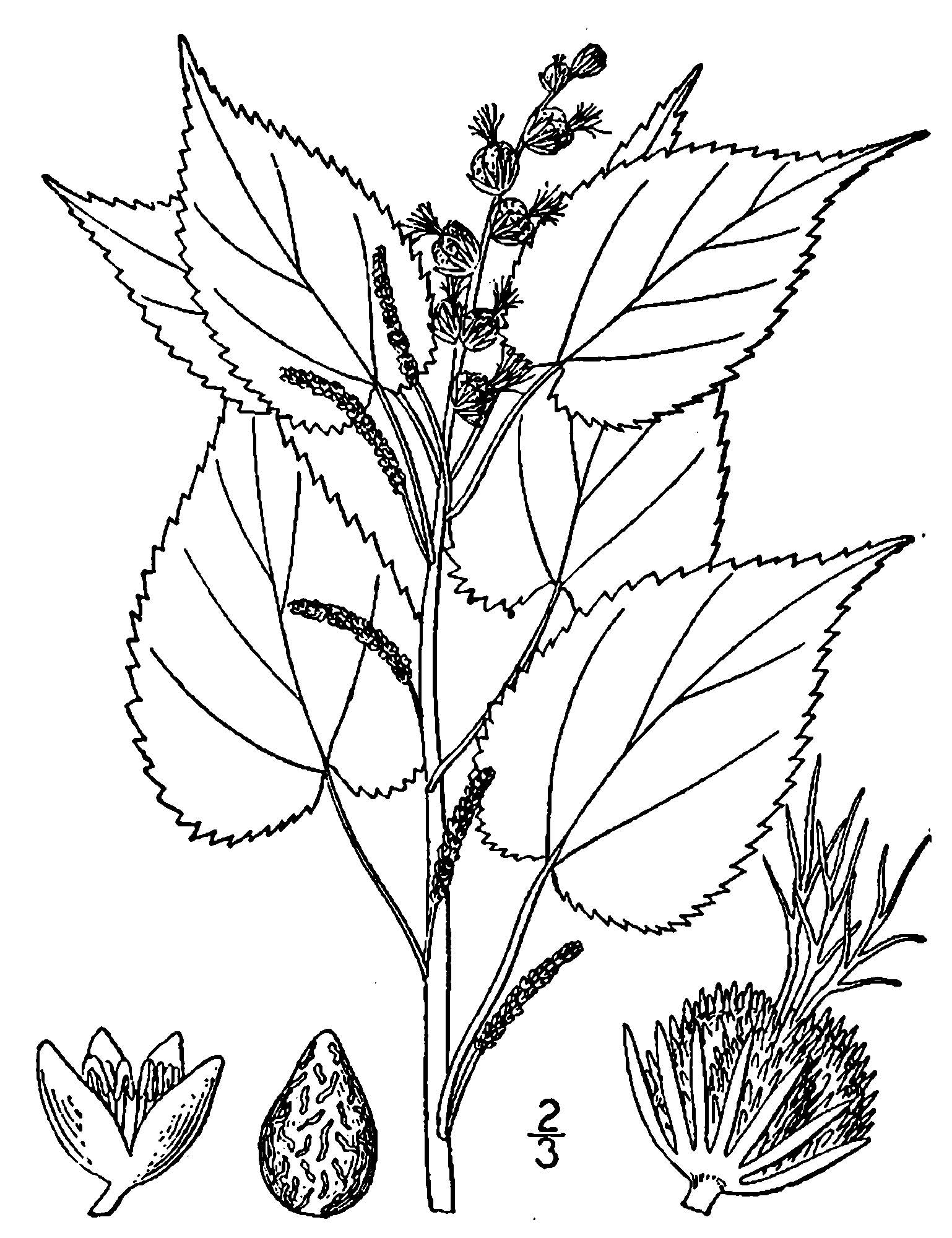
- Drawing of Acalypha ostryifolia
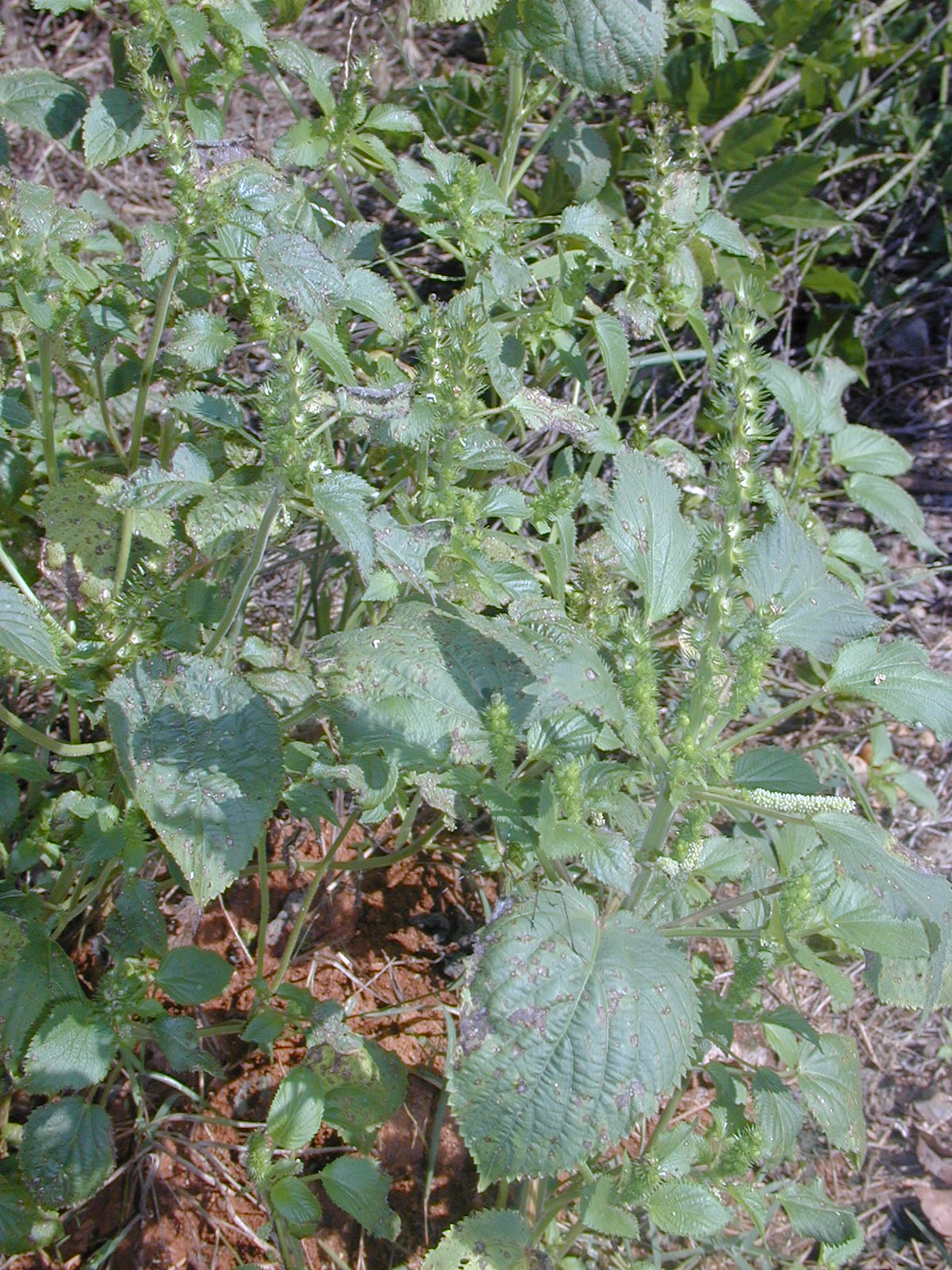
- Photo of Acalypha ostryifolia

Conservation status
- Secure (NatureServe)

Scientific classification
- Kingdom: Plantae
- Clade: Tracheophytes
- Clade: Angiosperms
- Clade: Eudicots
- Clade: Rosids
- Order: Malpighiales
- Family: Euphorbiaceae
- Subtribe: Acalyphinae
- Genus: Acalypha
- Species: A. ostryifolia

Binomial name
- Acalypha ostryifolia Riddell ex J.M. Coult.

Synonyms
- Acalypha corchorifolia A.Rich.; Ricinocarpus carolinianus Kuntze; Ricinocarpus persimilis (Müll.Arg.) Kuntze; Acalypha persimilis var. corchorifolia; Acalypha persimilis var. scabra; Acalypha persimilis Müll.Arg.; Acalypha pedunculata Klotzsch ex Pax & K.Hoffm.; Acalypha polystachya Griseb.; Acalypha caroliniana Elliott; Acalypha setosa Bello

= Acalypha ostryifolia =

Species of flowering plant

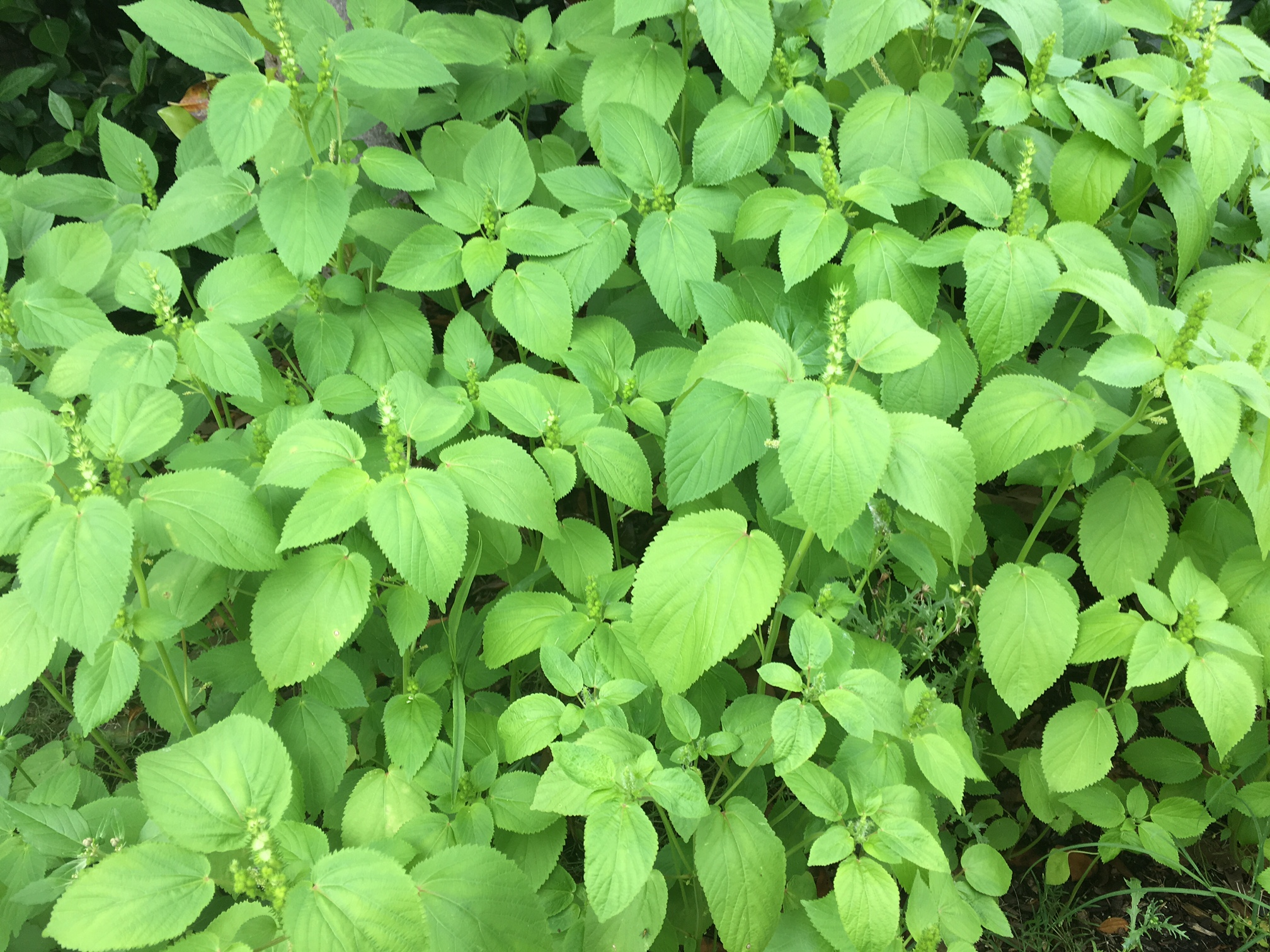
Hophornbeam copperleaf

Acalypha ostryifolia, sometimes spelled ostryaefolia, is a plant in the family Euphorbiaceae and is commonly known as hophornbeam copperleaf, hornbeam copperleaf, or pineland threeseed mercury, is an annual herb of the copperleaf genus Acalypha. It is a native of North and Central America and is generally considered a weed.

== Description ==
Acalypha ostryifolia is an annual herb reaching a height of up to 75 cm (30 in) tall. The stems are upright, branching, purplish-green with vertical striations, short recurved hairs and stalked glands. Its leaves are alternate, petiolate, simple and ovate, with serrate or dentate margins, a cordate base and slight pubescence, and grow to 10 cm (3.9 in) in length. Male and female flowers are in separate spikes, the staminate, males on short axillary spikes and the pistillate females in elongated, interrupted, terminal spikes. The male flowers have four ovate greenish sepals often tinged red and no petals. The female flowers are also petal-less but have three styles which subdivide into white hairs which give the inflorescence a furry appearance. Its three-lobed capsule is depressed-globose to ovoid, grows up to 5 mm (3/16 in) across, with typically three ovoid, wrinkled seeds that are around 2 mm (1/16 in) in length and brown with low bumpy ridges. Flowering time is from June to November .

== Distribution and habitat ==
Acalypha ostryifolia grows in Cuba, the Dominican Republic, Haiti, Jamaica, Puerto Rico, Mexico, Guatemala, Belize, Costa Rica, El Salvador, Honduras, Nicaragua.Ecuador, the West Indies, and the United States, including the US states AL, AR, AZ, FL, GA, IA, IL, IN, KS, KY, LA, MO, MS, NC, NE, NJ, NM, OH, OK, PA, SC, TN, TX, VA, and WV, and the US unincorporated territories of Puerto Rico and the US Virgin Islands. It has been introduced to Southern Italy.

Acalypha ostryifolia grows in riverbanks, fields, bluffs, roadsides, canyons and slopes. It can be adventive in cultivated fields, where it can be a pest species.

== Ecology ==
The hophornbeam copperleaf is a summer weed growing in cultivated fields and waste places. It has a high germination rate and the seedlings are resistant to cold and grow as fast as soybean plants in the Midwest. It is resistant to most of the herbicides used in soybean crops with the exception of lactofen, acifluorfen and fomesafen, which controlled over 80%. Lactofen was the most successful of these with a kill rate of 95%.

The spotted lady beetle (Coleomegilla maculata) commonly lays eggs on this plant when it grows near sweet corn crops in Kentucky. Research has shown that the insect favoured the weed over the corn, even though it was not infested by aphids on which the larvae could feed. The larvae were found to fall from the weeds and crawl across the soil before climbing sweet corn plants. The presence of the weed in close proximity to the crop was beneficial and resulted in more beetle larvae on the crop and fewer aphids than was the case when the weed was absent.

== Gallery ==
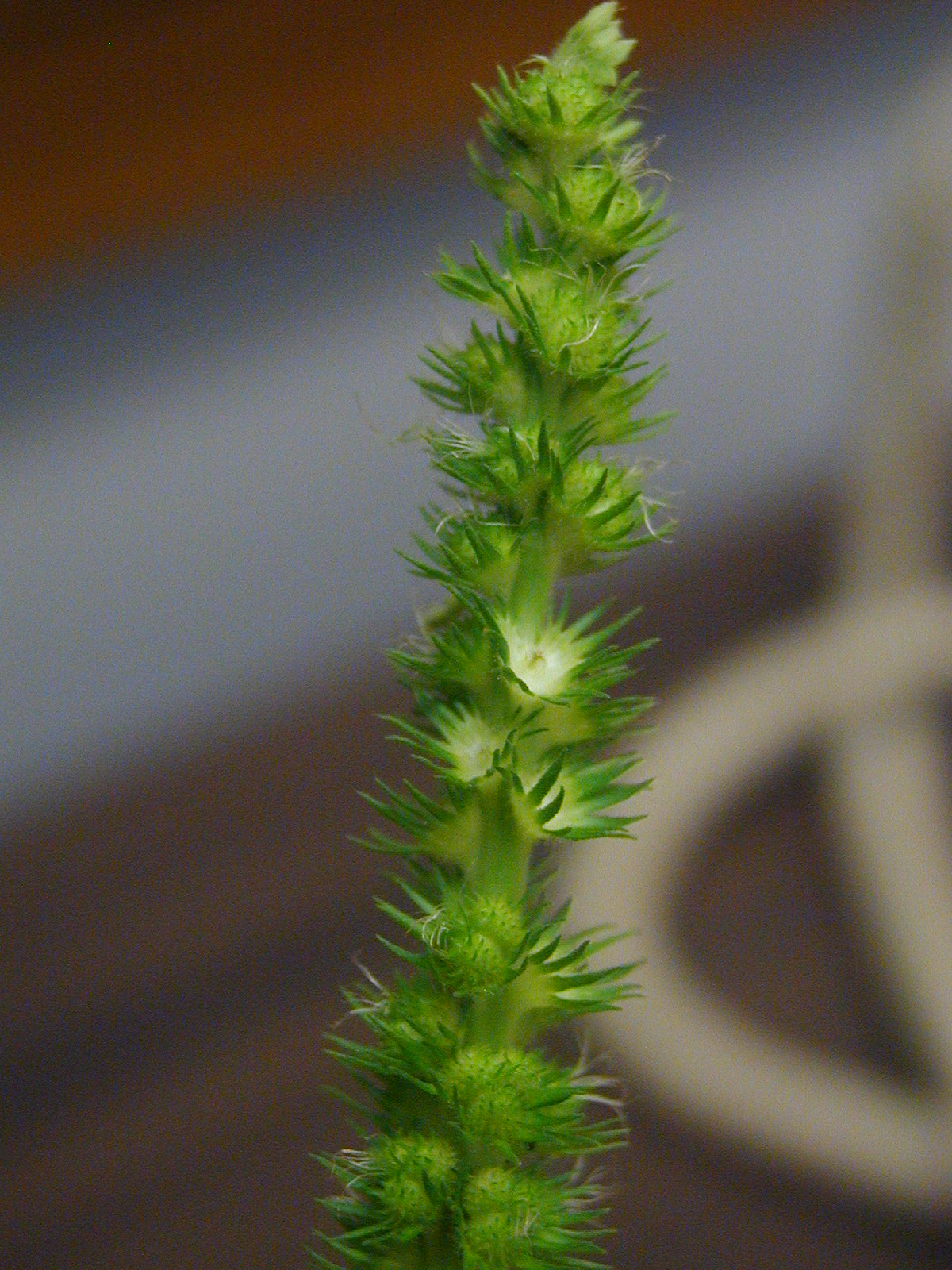
female inflorescence

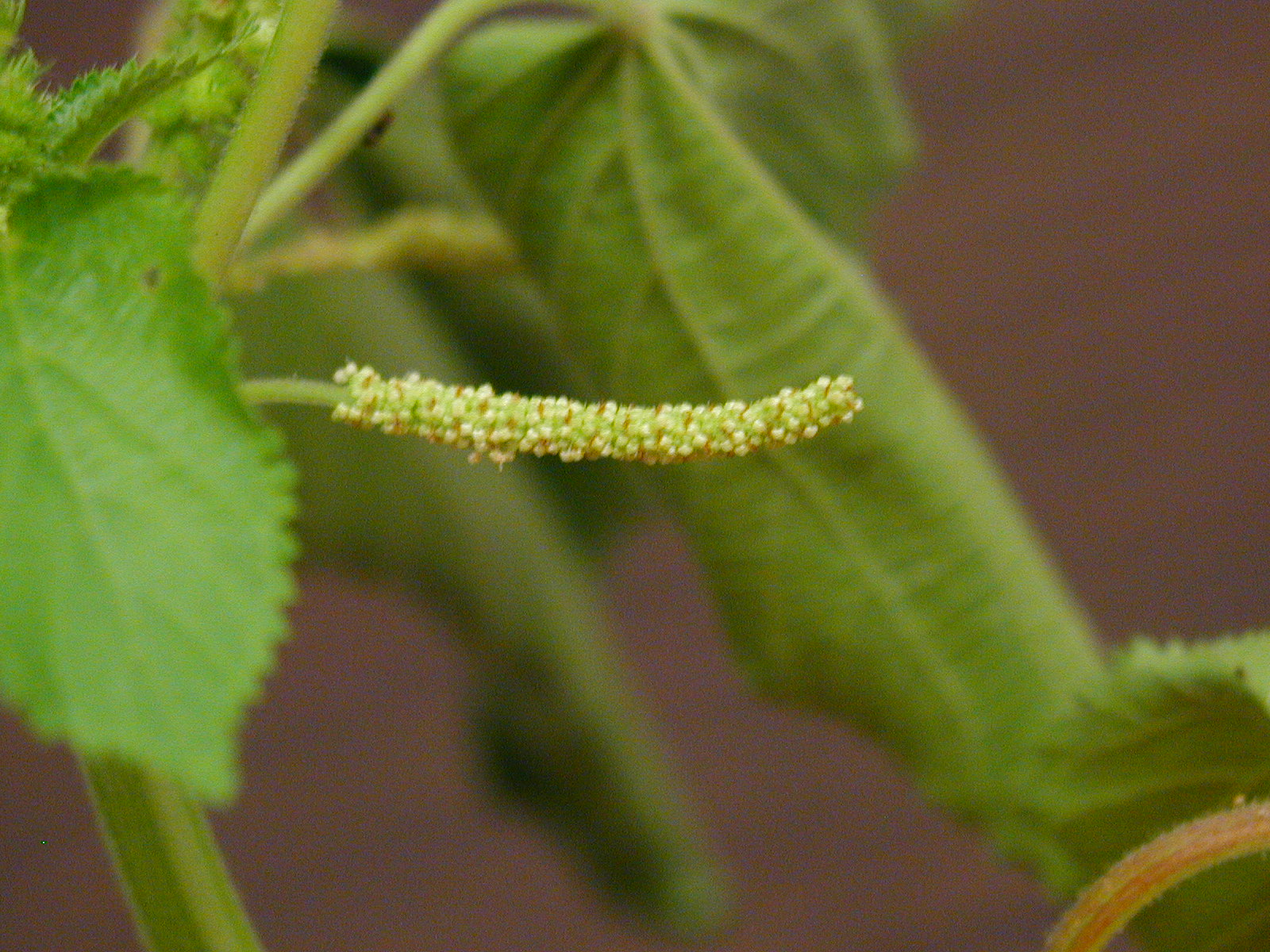
male inflorescence

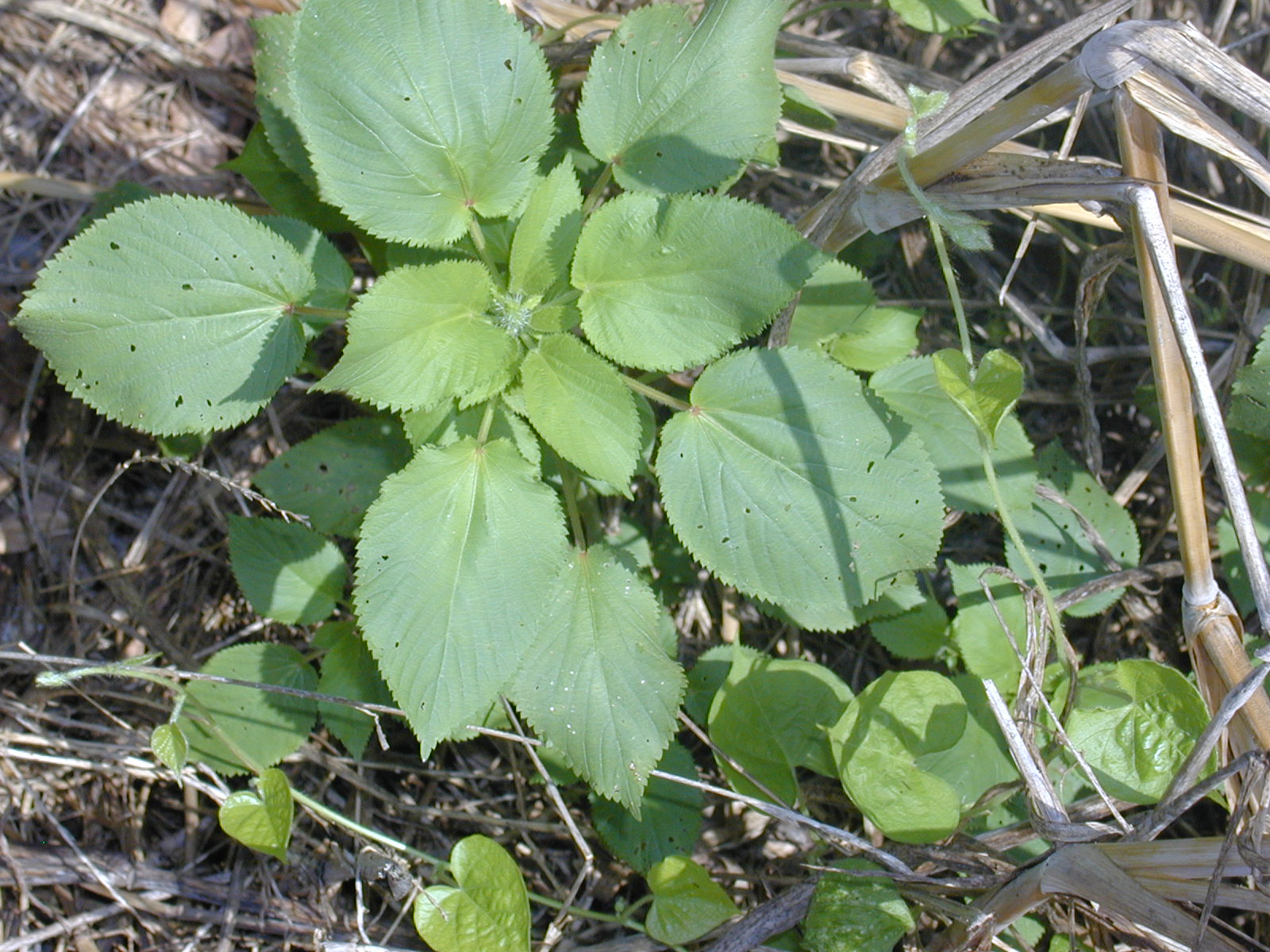
young plant, topview
