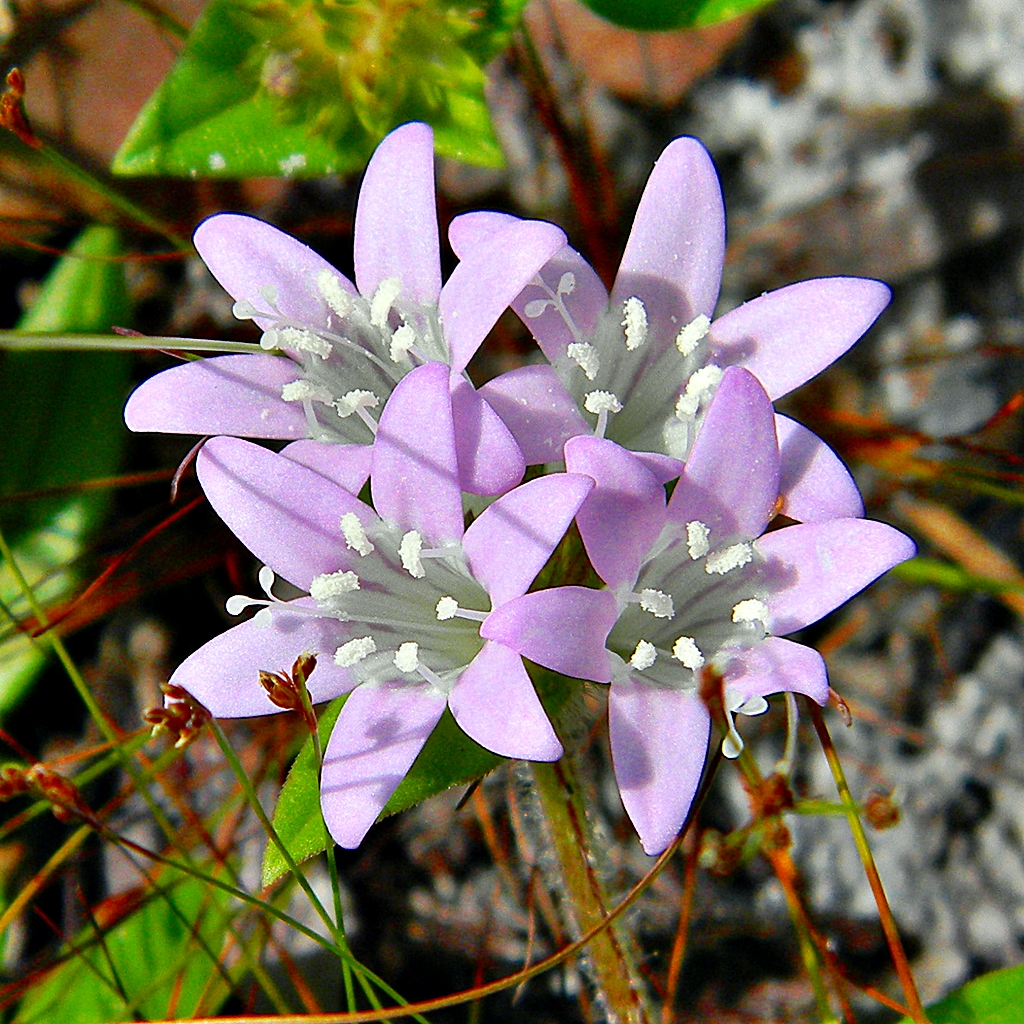

Scientific classification
- Kingdom: Plantae
- Clade: Tracheophytes
- Clade: Angiosperms
- Clade: Eudicots
- Clade: Asterids
- Order: Gentianales
- Family: Rubiaceae
- Genus: Richardia
- Species: R. grandiflora

Binomial name
- Richardia grandiflora (Cham. & Schltdl.) Steud.

Synonyms
- List: Richardia divergens (Pohl ex DC.) Steud.; Richardia grandiflora f. albiflora Kuntze; Richardia grandiflora f. lilacina Kuntze; Richardia lateralis (Pohl ex DC.) Steud.; Richardia sparsa (Pohl ex DC.) Steud.; Richardsonia divergens Pohl ex DC.; Richardsonia grandiflora Cham. & Schltdl.; Richardsonia lateralis Pohl ex DC.; Richardsonia sparsa Pohl ex DC.; Spermacoce divergens Pohl ex DC.; Spermacoce lateralis Pohl ex DC.; Spermacoce sparsa Pohl ex DC.

= Richardia grandiflora =

Species of plant

Richardia grandiflora, the largeflower Mexican clover, largeflower pusley, or Florida snow, is a species of flowering plant native to Brazil, Bolivia, Paraguay, Uruguay, and northeastern Argentina. It is in the Rubiaceae family. Used as a ground cover, it has proliferated in Florida where it has sometimes been perceived as a weed.

== See also ==
- Richardia scabra
