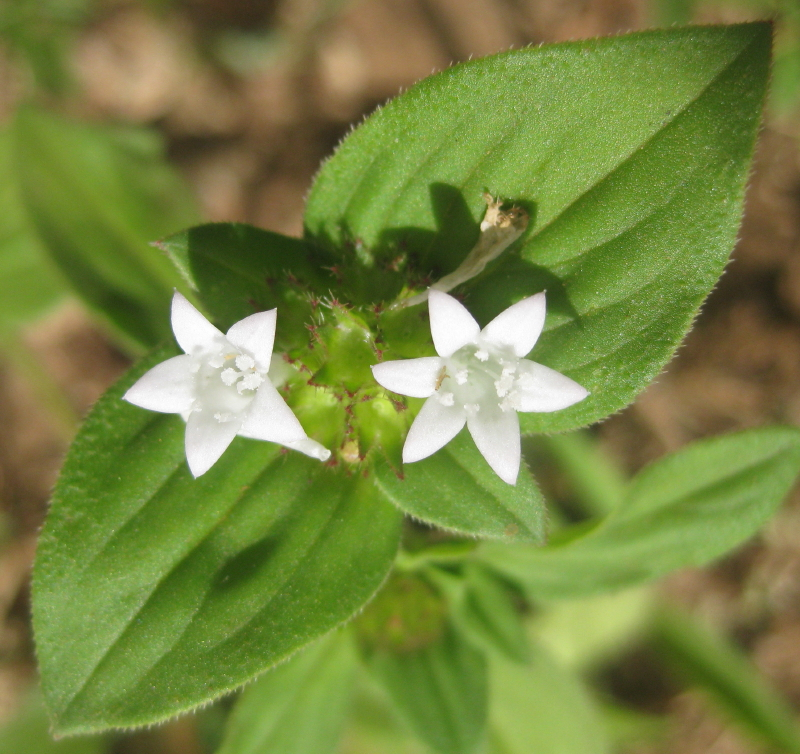

Scientific classification
- Kingdom: Plantae
- Clade: Tracheophytes
- Clade: Angiosperms
- Clade: Eudicots
- Clade: Asterids
- Order: Gentianales
- Family: Rubiaceae
- Genus: Richardia
- Species: R. brasiliensis

Binomial name
- Richardia brasiliensis Gomes

= Richardia brasiliensis =

Species of plant

Richardia brasiliensis is a species of flowering plant in the coffee family known by the English common names tropical Mexican clover, Brazilian calla-lily, white-eye, and Brazil pusley. In Brazil it is known as poaia branca. It is native to South America. It is an introduced species and sometimes an invasive weed in many other places, including Sub-Saharan Africa, India, Australia, Hawaii, Indonesia, Japan, and Thailand. It is a weed of citrus groves in Florida.

== Description ==
This plant may be an annual or perennial which grows from a deep root. The branching stems grow up to 40 centimeters (16 in) long and lie prostrate or grow upright. The oppositely arranged leaves are oval with pointed or rounded tips and can grow to be 6.5 cm long and 2.4 cm wide. The inflorescence is a cluster of up to 20 flowers, or sometimes more, up to 15 mm in diameter accompanied by 2 pairs of small, wide leaves underneath. The petals are white or rose-pink. The mature fruit is a schizocarp with three mericarps.

== Ecology ==
Richardia brasiliensis serves as a host for nematodes and bacteria that cause disease and damage to crops. Nematodes harbored in its roots cause dry rot in yams. In brassica fields, this plant hosts bacteria that cause black rot. As well as damaging pests, it can also host beneficial mites as a natural form of pest control.

== Uses ==
In Brazil this plant is used medicinally as an antiemetic and for diabetes. In traditional medicine, it is also used for anti-hemorrhoids, deworming and for treating eczema and burns. In Brazil, it is considered important to food, decoration, and pharmaceuticals.

== Etymology ==
The name Richardia comes from Richard Richardson, an English physician, while Brasiliensis indicates Brazil, the country of origin.
