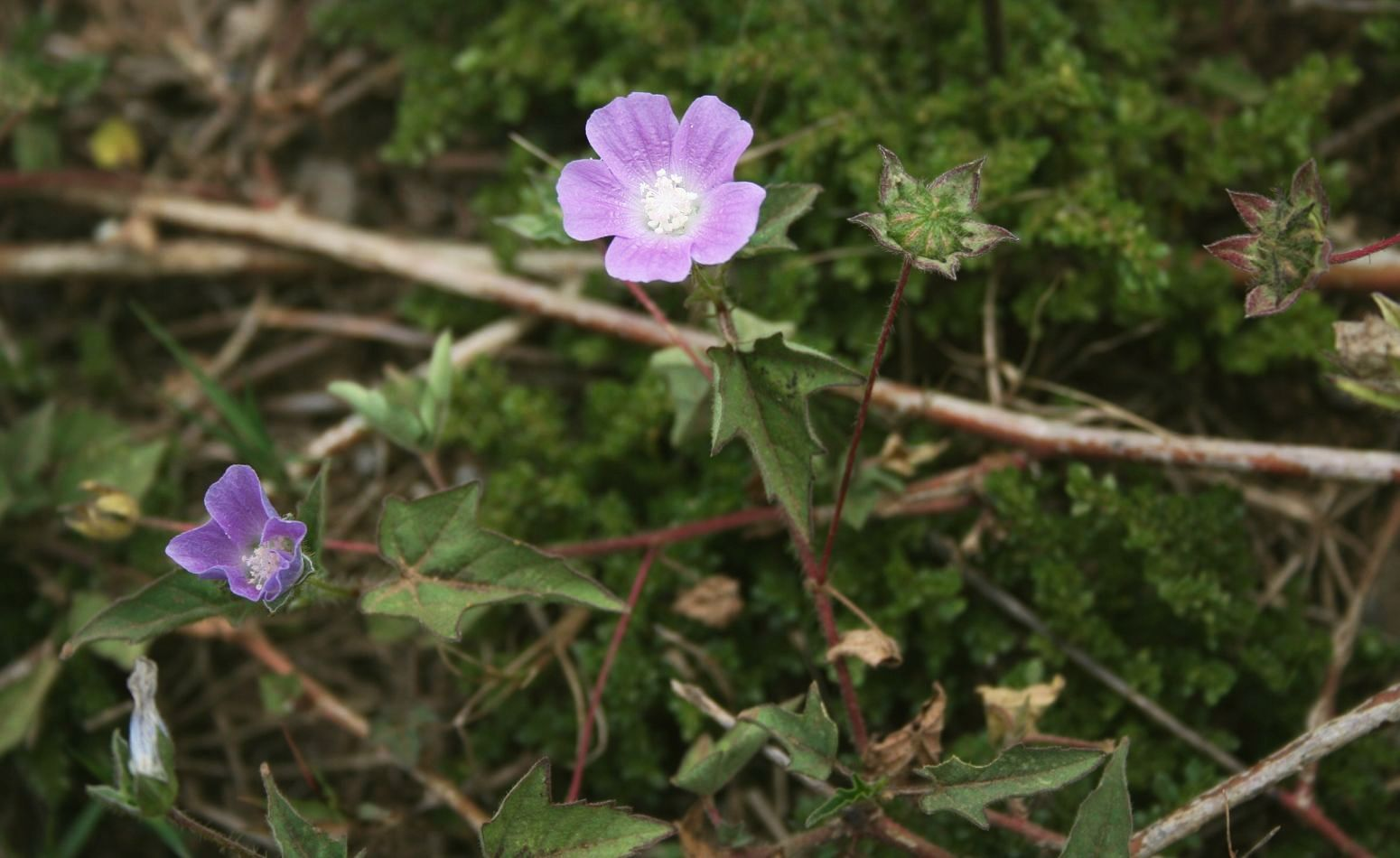
- Anoda cristata

Scientific classification
- Kingdom: Plantae
- Clade: Tracheophytes
- Clade: Angiosperms
- Clade: Eudicots
- Clade: Rosids
- Order: Malvales
- Family: Malvaceae
- Subfamily: Malvoideae
- Tribe: Malveae
- Genus: Anoda; Cav. (1785)

Species
- 24, see text

Synonyms
- Cavanillea Medik. (1787); Sidanoda Wooton & Standl. (1915)

= Anoda =

Genus of flowering plants

Anoda is a genus of flowering plants in the mallow family. It includes 24 species of herbs, native to the subtropical and tropical Americas from the southwestern United States (Arizona, New Mexico, and Texas) through Mexico, Central America, and western South America to northern Argentina and southern Chile. They are generally erect plants with a variety of leaf shapes, and many bear colorful flowers. Most bear distinctive disk-shaped segmented fruits.

== Species ==
There are 24 species assigned to this genus:

- Anoda abutiloides A.Gray – Indian anoda
- Anoda acerifolia Cav.
- Anoda albiflora Fryxell
- Anoda crenatiflora Ortega – thicket anoda
- Anoda cristata (L.) Schltdl. – crested anoda, spurred anoda, violeta del campo
- Anoda guatemalensis Fryxell
- Anoda henricksonii M.C.Johnst.
- Anoda hintoniorum Fryxell
- Anoda hirta Fryxell
- Anoda lanceolata Hook. & Arn. – lanceleaf anoda
- Anoda leonensis Fryxell
- Anoda maculata Fryxell
- Anoda palmata Fryxell
- Anoda paniculata Hochr.
- Anoda pedunculosa Hochr.
- Anoda pentaschista A.Gray – field anoda
- Anoda polygyna Fryxell
- Anoda pristina Fryxell
- Anoda pubescens Schltdl.
- Anoda reflexa Díaz-Contreras & Cruz Durán
- Anoda reticulata S.Watson – netted anoda
- Anoda speciosa Fryxell
- Anoda succulenta Fryxell
- Anoda thurberi A.Gray – Arizona anoda
