= All-trans-nonaprenyl diphosphate synthase (geranylgeranyl-diphosphate specific) =

Class of enzymes

Identifiers
- EC no.: 2.5.1.85

Databases
- BRENDA: enzyme data
- ExPASy: NiceZyme view
- KEGG: enzyme entry
- MetaCyc: metabolic pathway
- Rhea: reactions
- PDB structures: RCSB PDB PDBe PDBsum
Search
- PMC: articles
- PubMed: articles
- NCBI: proteins

All-trans-nonaprenyl diphosphate synthase (geranylgeranyl-diphosphate specific) (EC 2.5.1.85, nonaprenyl diphosphate synthase, solanesyl diphosphate synthase, At-SPS2, At-SPS1, SPS1, SPS2) is an enzyme with systematic name geranylgeranyl-diphosphate:isopentenyl-diphosphate transtransferase (adding 5 isopentenyl units). This enzyme catalyses the following chemical reaction

geranylgeranyl diphosphate + 5 isopentenyl diphosphate $\rightleftharpoons$ 5 diphosphate + all-trans-nonaprenyl diphosphate

Geranylgeranyl diphosphate is preferred over farnesyl diphosphate as allylic substrate.

In 2020, aclonifen was shown to inhibit the enzyme and is the first compound to have this mechanism of action as a herbicide.
