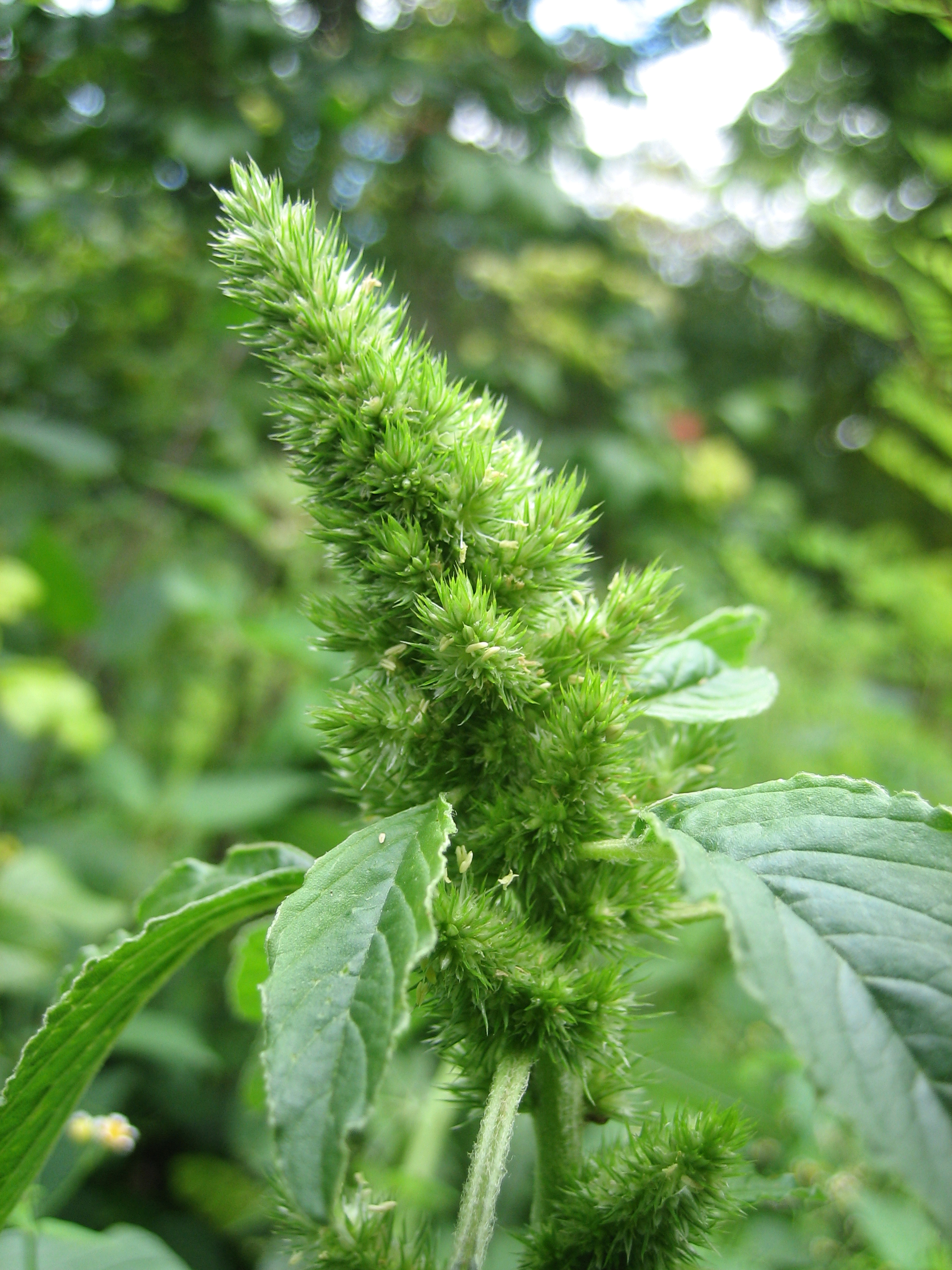

Conservation status
- Secure (NatureServe)

Scientific classification
- Kingdom: Plantae
- Clade: Embryophytes
- Clade: Tracheophytes
- Clade: Spermatophytes
- Clade: Angiosperms
- Clade: Eudicots
- Order: Caryophyllales
- Family: Amaranthaceae
- Genus: Amaranthus
- Species: A. retroflexus

Binomial name
- Amaranthus retroflexus L.

Synonyms
- Amaranthus bulgaricus Kov.; Amaranthus bullatus Besser ex Spreng.; Amaranthus chlorostachys Willk.; Amaranthus curvifolius Spreng.; Amaranthus delilei Richt. & Loret; Amaranthus johnstonii Kov.; Amaranthus recurvatus Desf.; Amaranthus retroflexus var. delilei (Richt. & Loret) Thell.; Amaranthus retroflexus subsp. delilei (Richt. & Loret) Tzvelev; Amaranthus retroflexus var. genuinus (L.) Thell. ex Probst; Amaranthus retroflexus var. rubricaulis Thell.; Amaranthus retroflexus f. rubricaulis Thell. ex Probst; Amaranthus retroflexus var. salicifolius lI.M.Johnst.; Amaranthus rigidus Schult. ex Steud.; Amaranthus spicatus Lam.; Amaranthus strictus Ten.; Amaranthus tricolor L.; Galliaria retroflexa (L.) Nieuwl.; Galliaria scabra Bubani

= Amaranthus retroflexus =

Species of flowering plant

Amaranthus retroflexus is a species of flowering plant in the family Amaranthaceae with several common names, including red-root amaranth, redroot pigweed, red-rooted pigweed, common amaranth, pigweed amaranth, and common tumbleweed.

Outside of its native range, it is considered a weed. Leaves, stems and seeds may be eaten raw and cooked, the leaves have a high nutritional value. When grown on nitrogen-rich soils they are known to concentrate nitrates in the leaves, especially noticeable on land where nitrate fertilizer is used.

== Description ==
Amaranthus retroflexus, true to one of its common names, forms a tumbleweed. It is an erect, annual herb growing to 1 m (3 1/2 ft). The leaves are nearly 15 cm (6 in) long on large individuals, the ones higher on the stem having a lance shape and those lower on the plant diamond or oval in shape. The plant is monoecious, with individuals bearing both male and female flowers. The inflorescence is a large, dense cluster of flowers interspersed with spiny green bracts. The fruit is a capsule less than 2 mm (1/16 in) long with a "lid" which opens to reveal a tiny black seed.

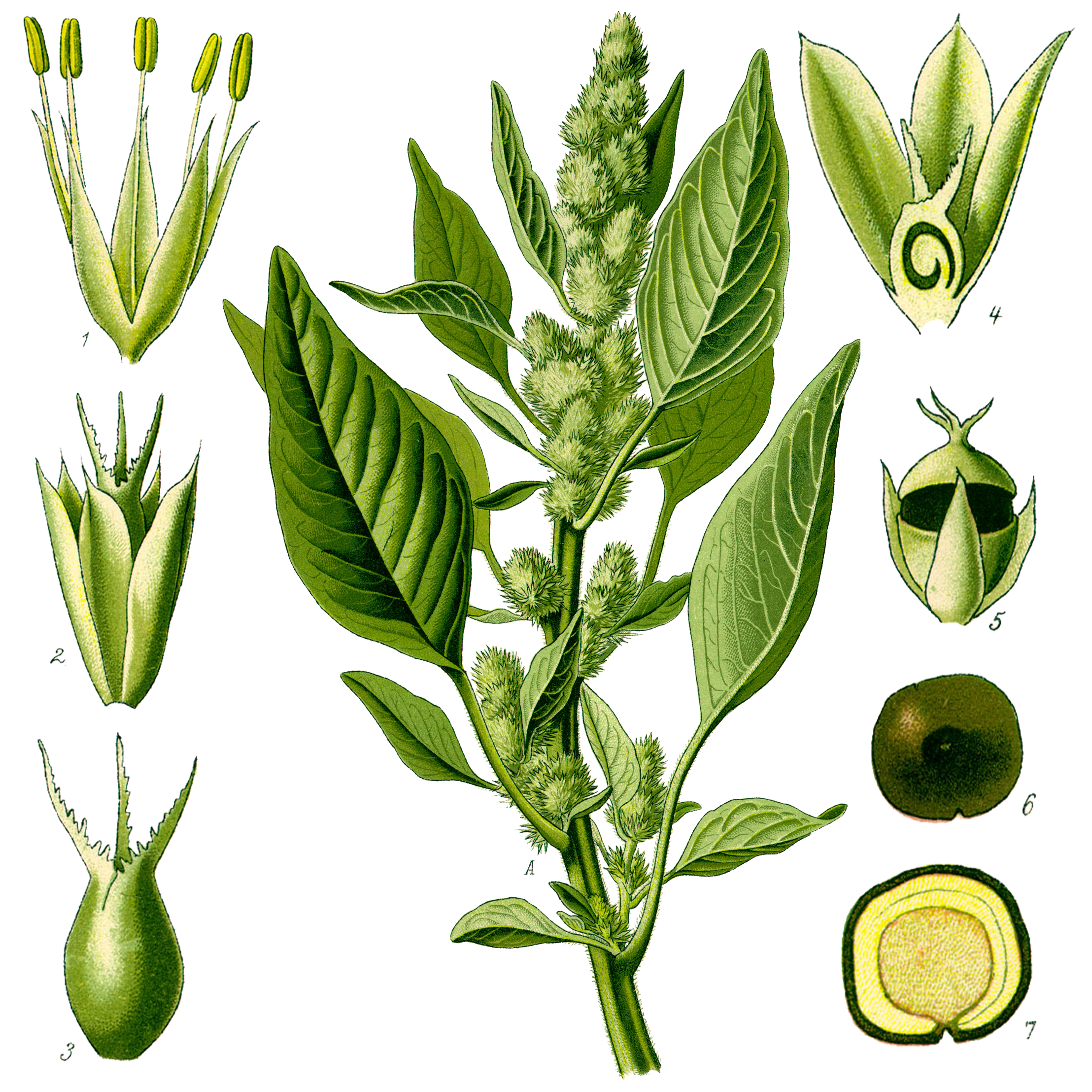
1885 illustration

== Distribution and habitat ==
It may be native to the Neotropics or Central and Eastern North America, but is widespread as an introduced species on most continents in a great number of habitats.

One common name is "pigweed" because it grows where hogs are pasture-fed.

== As a weed ==
A. retroflexus is a weed outside its native range and has developed resistance against fomesafen in Northeast China.

== Potential toxicity ==
No species of genus Amaranthus is known to be poisonous to humans, but the leaves of A. retroflexus contain oxalic acid and may contain nitrates if grown in nitrate-rich soils.

Like many other species of Amaranthus, this plant may be harmful and even deadly when fed to cattle and pigs in large amounts over several days. Such forage may cause fatal nephrotoxicity, presumably because of its high oxalate content. Other symptoms, such as bloat or methemoglobinemia in the most severe cases, might reflect its high nitrate content.

== Uses ==
=== Culinary ===
This plant is eaten as a vegetable in different places of the world. The water should be discarded after boiling due to the presence of oxalic acid and possibly nitrates. The young shoots and leaves can be eaten raw. The leaves are high in calcium, iron, protein, and phosphorus.

A. retroflexus was used for a multitude of food and medicinal purposes by many Native American groups in the western United States. It is among the species consumed as a vegetable in Mexican markets as Quelite quintonil.

It is used in the Indian state of Kerala to prepare a popular dish known as thoran by combining the finely cut leaves (cheera ) with grated coconut, chili peppers, garlic, turmeric and other ingredients.

The seeds are edible raw or toasted, and can be ground into flour and used for bread, hot cereal, or as a thickener.

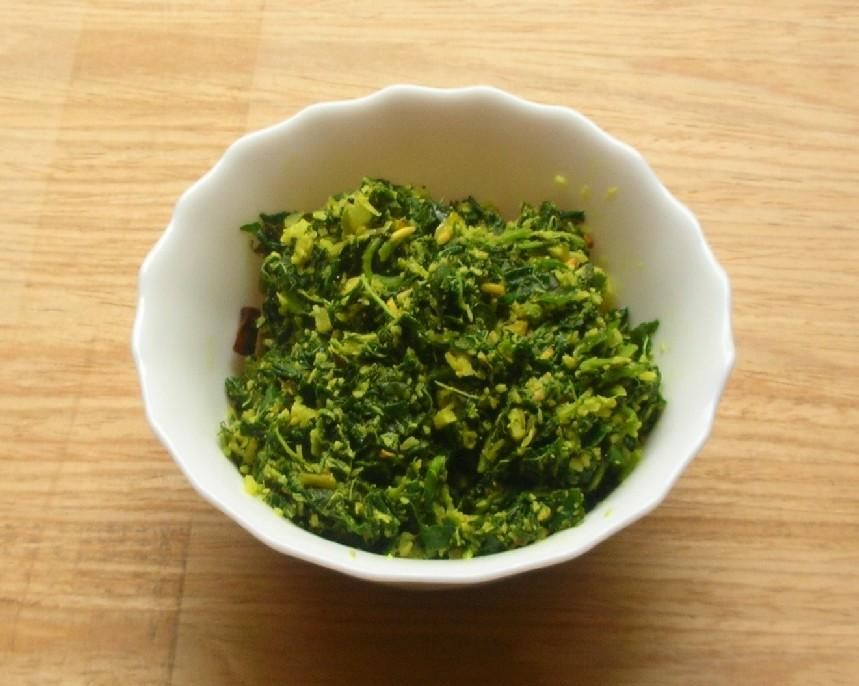
Southern Kerala-style traditional thoran made with A. retroflexus

=== As fodder ===
When supplied in moderation (circumventing its toxicity to livestock), it is regarded as an exceptionally nutritious fodder.
