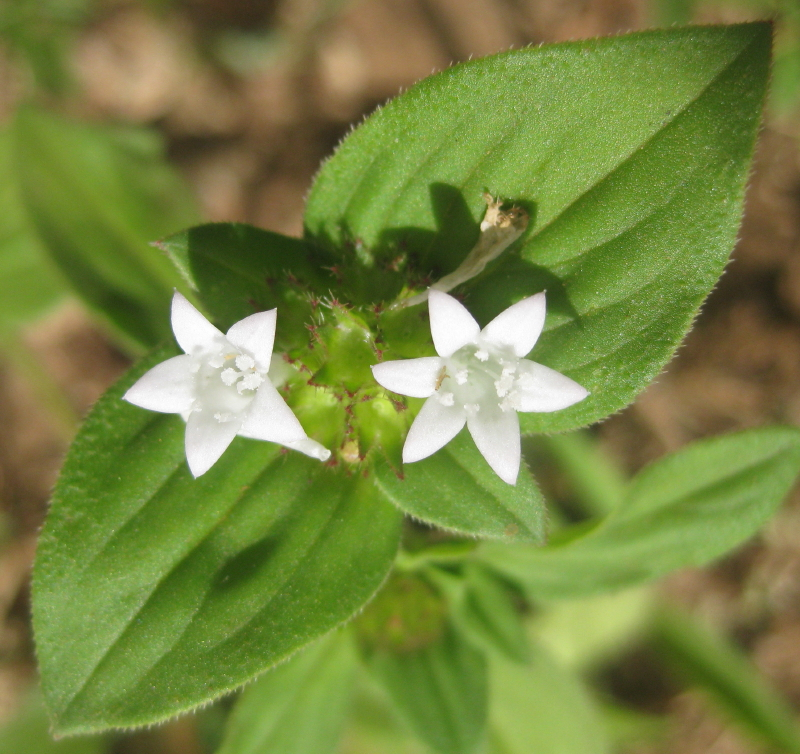
- Richardia brasiliensis

Scientific classification
- Kingdom: Plantae
- Clade: Tracheophytes
- Clade: Angiosperms
- Clade: Eudicots
- Clade: Asterids
- Order: Gentianales
- Family: Rubiaceae
- Tribe: Spermacoceae
- Genus: Richardia; L.

Type species
- Richardia scabra L.

Species
- About 15 species; see text

= Richardia =

Genus of plants

Richardia (Mexican-clover) is a genus of about fifteen species of flowering plants in the family Rubiaceae. They are native to tropical to warm, temperate regions of the Americas, with one species also native to Fiji. They are mostly annual plants, though a few species are herbaceous perennial plants.

Selected species

- Richardia brasiliensis. Guyana and Brazil south to northern Argentina.
- Richardia grandiflora. Brazil.
- Richardia scabra. Southeastern United States south to Peru.
- Richardia tricocco. Southern Louisiana and Texas south to central Mexico.

Richardia Kunth non L. is a synonym of the genus Zantedeschia in the family Araceae.
