= Bifenox =

Chemical compound used as an herbicide

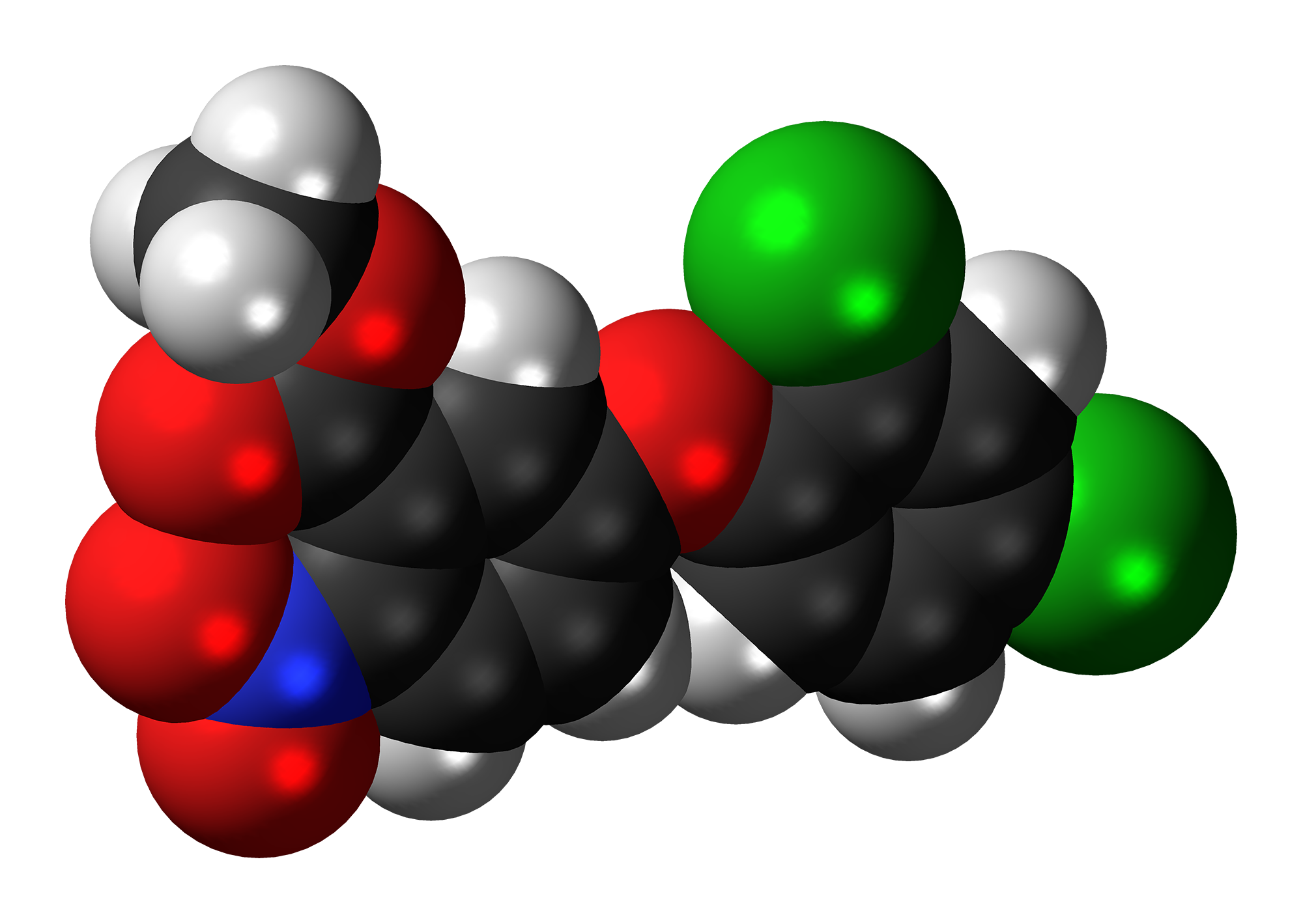
- Space filling model

Names
- Preferred IUPAC name Methyl 5-(2,4-dichlorophenoxy)-2-nitrobenzoate

Identifiers
CAS Number	42576-02-3
3D model (JSmol)	Interactive image
ChemSpider	35891
ECHA InfoCard	100.050.795
PubChem CID	39230
UNII	KSB85XT26Y
CompTox Dashboard (EPA)	DTXSID1040320
- InChI: InChI=1S/C14H9Cl2NO5/c1-21-14(18)10-7-9(3-4-12(10)17(19)20)22-13-5-2-8(15)6-11(13)16/h2-7H,1H3 Key: SUSRORUBZHMPCO-UHFFFAOYSA-N
- SMILES: COC(=O)c1cc(Oc2ccc(Cl)cc2Cl)ccc1[N+](=O)[O-]

Properties
Chemical formula	C_{14}H_{9}Cl_{2}NO_{5}
Molar mass	342.13 g·mol^{−1}
Appearance	Yellow solid
Melting point	85 °C (185 °F; 358 K)
Solubility in water	0.35 mg/L

Hazards
- Lethal dose or concentration (LD, LC)
LD_{50} (median dose)	6400 mg/kg (oral, rat)
- Except where otherwise noted, data are given for materials in their standard state (at 25 °C [77 °F], 100 kPa). Infobox references

Bifenox is the ISO common name for an organic compound used as an herbicide. It acts by inhibiting the enzyme protoporphyrinogen oxidase which is necessary for chlorophyll synthesis.

== History ==
The nitrophenyl ethers are a well-known class of herbicides, the oldest member of which was nitrofen, invented by Rohm & Haas and first registered for sale in 1964. This area of chemistry became very competitive, with the Mobil Oil Corporation's filing in 1969 and grant in 1974 of a patent to the structural analog with a COOCH_{3} group adjacent to the nitro group of nitrofen. Bifenox was launched with the brand name Modown in 1981. Meanwhile Rohm & Haas had patented and developed acifluorfen (as its sodium salt with brand name Blazer) in 1980. Both compounds had much improved properties including a wider spectrum of herbicidal effect and good safety to some crops, including soybean.

== Synthesis ==
Bifenox was first synthesized by R.J. Theissen of the agricultural research section of Mobil Chemical's Central Research Laboratory in 1969 .

Final step in the synthesis of bifenox

The preparation of bifenox first described in the Mobil patent includes as its final step an Ullmann condensation between the potassium salt of 2,4-dichlorophenol and methyl 2-nitro-5-chlorobenzoic acid.

The methyl 2-nitro-5-chlorobenzoic acid was made starting from toluene, chlorine, benzoic acid, methanol and nitric acid in a 5-step synthesis.

== Mechanism of action ==
The detailed mechanism of action for nitrofen, acifluorfen and related diphenyl ether herbicides was unknown at the time they were invented. The effects visible on whole plants are chlorosis and desiccation: several hypotheses were advanced regarding the molecular-level interactions which might explain these symptoms. The now-accepted explanation for the damage is that these compounds inhibit the enzyme protoporphyrinogen oxidase, which leads to an accumulation of protoporphyrin IX in the plant cells. This is a potent photosensitizer which activates oxygen, leading to lipid peroxidation. Both light and oxygen are required for this process to kill the plant.

Bifenox's HRAC classification is Group G (Australia), Group E (Global), or Group 14 (numeric).

== Uses ==
Bifenox is not currently used in the United States although in 1981 it had been subject to a full regulatory review, under the then-new "Registration Standard" process. Within the European Union, a 2-tiered approach is used for the approval and authorisation of pesticides. Firstly, before a formulated product can be developed for market, the active substance must be approved for the European Union. After this has been achieved, authorisation for the specific product must be sought from every Member State that the applicant wants to sell it to. Afterwards, there is a monitoring programme to make sure the pesticide residues in food are below the limits set by the European Food Safety Authority. Bifenox is registered for use against weeds in crops including cereals, soybeans, sugarbeet and rice. In Switzerland, some of its formulations can be used in lawns and orchards.

Bifenox is normally applied postemergence (when weeds are visible in the crop). It controls or suppresses a wide range of species including Capsella bursa-pastoris, Galium aparine, Lamium purpureum, Myosotis arvensis, Papaver rhoeas, Veronica hederifolia, Veronica persica and Viola arvensis. The product is typically used at application rates of 720 g a.i. per hectare.
