= Lactofen =

Names
- IUPAC name Ethyl O-[5-(2-chloro-α,α,α-trifluoro-p-tolyloxy)-2-nitrobenzoyl]-DL-lactate
- Other names 2-Ethoxy-1-methyl-2-oxoethyl 5-[2-chloro-4-(trifluoromethyl)phenoxy]-2-nitrobenzoate

Identifiers
CAS Number	77501-63-4
3D model (JSmol)	Interactive image
ChemSpider	56077
ECHA InfoCard	100.111.278
PubChem CID	62276
UNII	L44N8UV47O
CompTox Dashboard (EPA)	DTXSID7024160
- InChI: InChI=1S/C19H15ClF3NO7/c1-3-29-17(25)10(2)30-18(26)13-9-12(5-6-15(13)24(27)28)31-16-7-4-11(8-14(16)20)19(21,22)23/h4-10H,3H2,1-2H3 Key: CONWAEURSVPLRM-UHFFFAOYSA-N; InChI=1/C19H15ClF3NO7/c1-3-29-17(25)10(2)30-18(26)13-9-12(5-6-15(13)24(27)28)31-16-7-4-11(8-14(16)20)19(21,22)23/h4-10H,3H2,1-2H3 Key: CONWAEURSVPLRM-UHFFFAOYAB
- SMILES: CCOC(=O)C(C)OC(=O)c1cc(ccc1[N+](=O)[O-])Oc2ccc(cc2Cl)C(F)(F)F

Properties
Chemical formula	C_{19}H_{15}ClF_{3}NO_{7}
Molar mass	461.77 g·mol^{−1}
Appearance	White crystalline solid
Melting point	43.9 to 45.5 °C (111.0 to 113.9 °F; 317.0 to 318.6 K)
Solubility in water	0.1 mg/L @ 20 degrees C
- Except where otherwise noted, data are given for materials in their standard state (at 25 °C [77 °F], 100 kPa). verify (what is ?) Infobox references

Lactofen is a complex ester of acifluorfen and is a nitrophenyl ether selective herbicide and fungicide. It is used in postemergence applications to certain crops which are resistant to its action. The name "Lactofen" is approved by the American National Standards Institute and the Weed Science Society of America, and is also approved in China (乳氟禾草灵).

Lactofen is applied as a foliar spray and is commonly used to control broadleaved weeds in soybeans, cereals, potatoes and peanuts. It may be combined with oil or fertilizer adjuvants and surfactants. Some formulations include solvents such as xylenes and cumene. It is also used as a fungicide for Sclerotinia white moulds on soybean.

Lactofen is available in solid form or as an emulsifiable concentrate under the trade name COBRA.

== Toxicology ==
Lactofen is slightly non-toxic to humans when ingested or inhaled. It can cause skin irritation including reddening, swelling and possibly corrosive burns. It is a severe eye irritant and can cause permanent damage to the eyes when there is sufficient exposure.

It was found to be practically non-toxic to the species of birds that were studied. Toxicity to fish and other aquatic organisms varied and it was eliminated in fish within fourteen days. It is of low toxicity to bees.

Lactofen has a very low solubility in water and is not expected to contaminate surface waters. It binds tightly to soil and is then broken down in between one and seven days.
