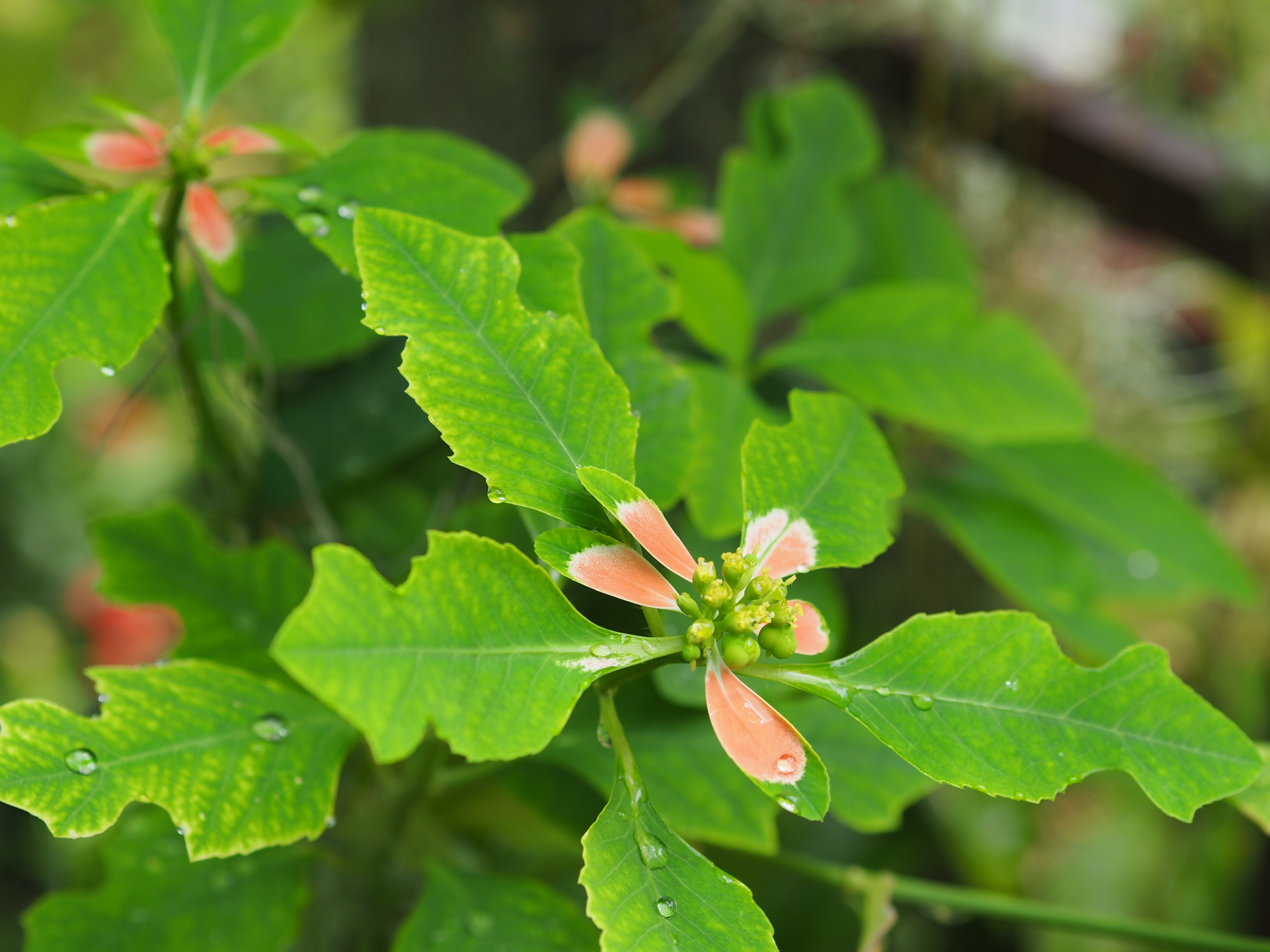

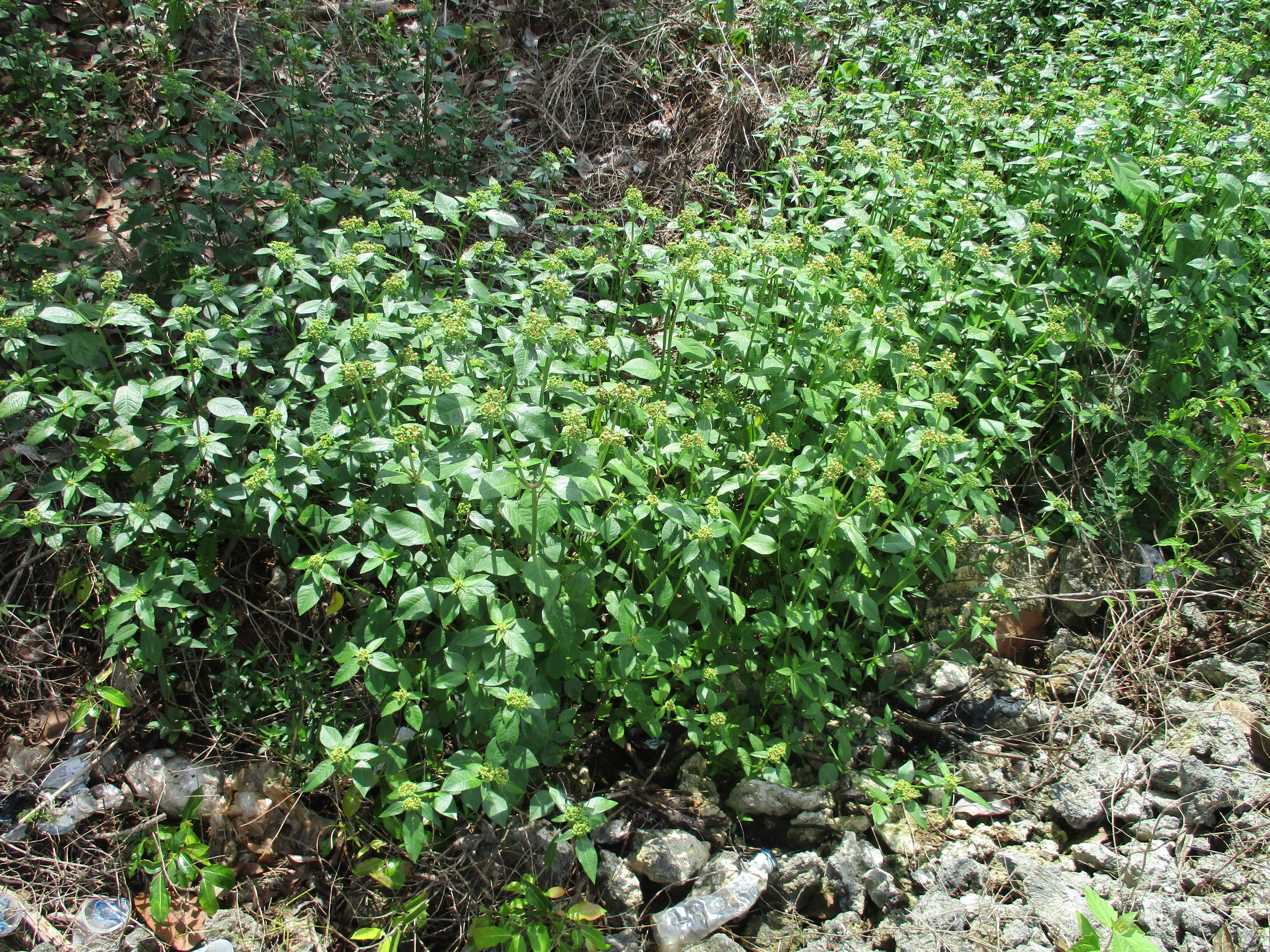

Conservation status
- Least Concern (IUCN 3.1)

Scientific classification
- Kingdom: Plantae
- Clade: Tracheophytes
- Clade: Angiosperms
- Clade: Eudicots
- Clade: Rosids
- Order: Malpighiales
- Family: Euphorbiaceae
- Tribe: Euphorbieae
- Subtribe: Euphorbiinae
- Genus: Euphorbia
- Species: E. heterophylla

Binomial name
- Euphorbia heterophylla L.

Synonyms
- Agaloma angustifolia Raf.; Cyathophora ciliata Raf.; Cyathophora heterophyla (L.) Raf.; Cyathophora picta Raf.; Euphorbia calyciflora Sessé & Moc.; Euphorbia elliptica Lam.; Euphorbia epilobiifolia W.T.Wang; Euphorbia frangulifolia Kunth; Euphorbia geniculata Ortega; Euphorbia havanensis Willd. ex Boiss. nom. illeg.; Euphorbia linifolia Vahl nom. illeg.; Euphorbia lockhartii Steud. nom. inval.; Euphorbia morisoniana Klotzsch; Euphorbia pandurata Huber; Euphorbia prunifolia Jacq.; Euphorbia taiwaniana S.S.Ying; Euphorbia trachyphylla A.Rich.; Poinsettia frangulifolia (Kunth) Klotzsch & Garcke; Poinsettia geniculata (Ortega) Klotzsch & Garcke; Poinsettia havanensis Small; Poinsettia heterophylla (L.) Klotzsch & Garcke; Poinsettia morisoniana (Klotzsch) Klotzsch & Garcke; Poinsettia prunifolia (Jacq.) Klotzsch & Garcke; Poinsettia ruiziana Klotzsch & Garcke; Tithymalus heterophyllus (L.) Haw.; Tithymalus prunifolius (Jacq.) Haw.

= Euphorbia heterophylla =

Painted euphorbia

Species of plant

Euphorbia heterophylla, also known under the common names of Mexican fireplant, painted euphorbia, Japanese poinsettia, paintedleaf, painted spurge and milkweed, is a plant belonging to the Euphorbiaceae or spurge family.

== Distribution ==
Euphorbia heterophylla is native to tropical and subtropical America but is now widespread throughout the tropics. Many herbicides fail to control it and hence it has spread rapidly in many parts of the world.

This plant has been introduced to South and Southeast Asia as an ornamental plant, having become a weed in India and Thailand, where it has invaded cotton fields and other agricultural terrain.

== Description ==
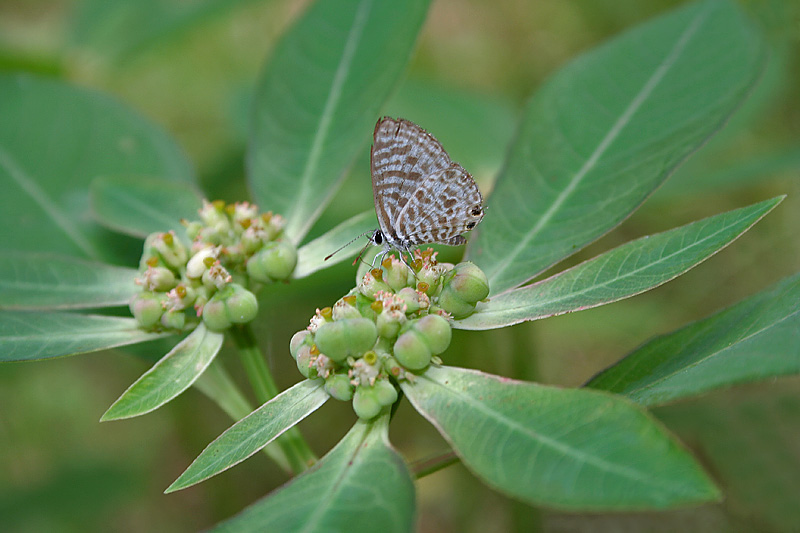
Euphorbia heterophylla after losing coloration of its cyathia

Euphorbia heterophylla grows between 30 and 100 cm tall and has hollow stems that may be branched or simple with angular ribs. The leaves of the plant have variable shapes within and between populations. The lower leaves are alternate whereas the upper leaves are opposite and commonly have a whitish or bright red base.

Within 30 days of emergence the plant may flower with ripe seeds being formed between 25 and 30 days later. It is pollinated by insects which are attracted to large amounts of nectar the plant produces. Extrafloral nectaries at the flower were first reported on E. heterophylla by Zimmerman 1932.

The stalk exudes a toxic milky white latex. The cyathia or false flowers, are located in clusters at the head of the stalk and are yellowish green. They have no petals, the red color being part of the young leaves' coloration. The fruits are small, segmented capsules. When the fruits are mature, they explode and shoot the seeds some distance from the parent plant allowing the plant to disperse.

This plant often loses its coloration when it grows wild as a weed. There are populations that have been identified to have resistance to specific herbicides in South America.

== Toxicity ==
Toxicity is documented in most members of the genus Euphorbia. Individuals sensitive to latex are known to have strong reactions, including dermatitis and anaphylaxis, to the latex exuded by this plant.

== As a weed ==
E. heterophylla has developed herbicide resistance against fomesafen and imazethapyr in its native Brazil.
