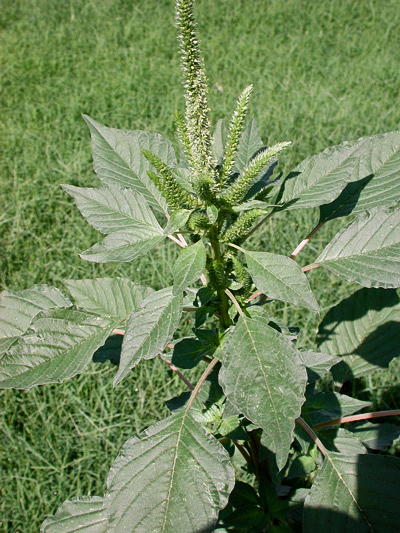
- Male plant

Conservation status
- Secure (NatureServe)

Scientific classification
- Kingdom: Plantae
- Clade: Tracheophytes
- Clade: Angiosperms
- Clade: Eudicots
- Order: Caryophyllales
- Family: Amaranthaceae
- Genus: Amaranthus
- Species: A. palmeri

Binomial name
- Amaranthus palmeri S.Wats.

= Amaranthus palmeri =

Species of plant

Amaranthus palmeri is a species of edible flowering plant in the amaranth genus. It has several common names, including carelessweed, dioecious amaranth, Palmer's amaranth, Palmer amaranth, and Palmer's pigweed.

It is native to most of the southern half of North America. Populations in the eastern United States are probably naturalized. It has also been introduced to Europe, Australia, and other areas. The plant is fast-growing and highly competitive.

== Uses ==
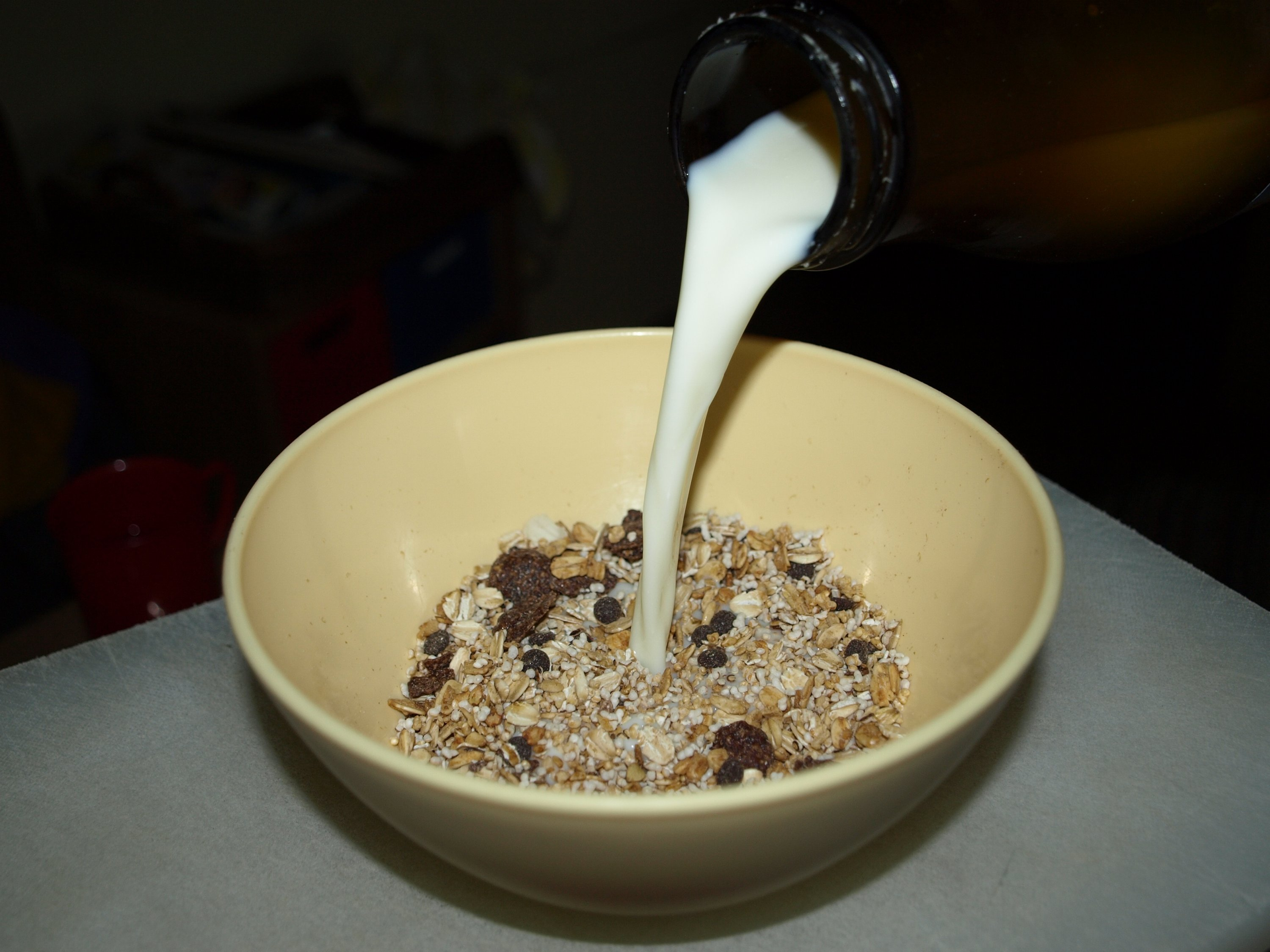
Amaranth muesli mix

The leaves, stems, and seeds of Palmer amaranth, like those of other amaranths, are edible and highly nutritious. Palmer amaranth was once widely cultivated and eaten by Native Americans across North America, both for its abundant seeds and as a cooked or dried green vegetable. Other related Amaranthus species have been grown as crops for their greens and seeds for thousands of years in Mexico, South America, the Caribbean, Africa, India, and China.

The plant can be toxic to non-ruminant livestock animals due to the presence of nitrates in the leaves. Palmer amaranth has a tendency to absorb excess soil nitrogen, and if grown in overly fertilized soils, it can contain excessive levels of nitrates, even for humans. Like spinach and many other leafy greens, amaranth leaves also contain oxalic acid, which can be harmful to individuals with kidney problems if consumed in excess.

Because of its toxicity to livestock, and scarce familiarity in the United States with the uses of amaranths as food, Palmer amaranth is rarely consumed as of 2020, despite its ubiquity and resistance to drought. Unlike the grain and leaf amaranths of other regions, it has not been cultivated or further improved by recent agricultural breeding. As a result, the primary economic importance of Palmer amaranth to American farmers has been as a noxious weed and a competitor to more marketable crops, rather than as a crop in its own right.

== As a weed ==
Palmer amaranth is considered a threat most specifically to the production of cotton and soybean crops in the southern United States. In 2001, Palmer amaranth was found in the southern quarter of Illinois and appeared to be moving to northern Illinois in 2006.

=== Herbicide resistance ===
In many places, the plant has developed resistance since at least 2006 to glyphosate, a widely used broad-spectrum herbicide. Glyphosate-resistant pigweed not only dominates in cotton fields, but also has wide-ranging effects on other crops and productions.

In 2014, the Texas Department of Agriculture asked the United States Environmental Protection Agency for permission to use the restricted chemical propazine on 3 million acres (1.2 million hectares) of cotton threatened by Palmer amaranth. The request was denied due to unacceptable risks to drinking water.

In 2019, Kansas State University researchers documented a population of Palmer amaranth with resistance to 2,4-D and dicamba in Kansas. Previously, Palmer amaranth in Kansas has developed resistance to ALS, atrazine, glyphosate, and HPPD herbicides—mesotrione, Huskie, Laudis, Impact, and Armezon—leaving growers with very few postemergence options to manage this weed.

An Arkansas population has developed fomesafen resistance.

Gene drive technologies could provide a countermeasure: A gene drive agent could engineer A. palmeri to become glyphosate-sensitive again. Such a wide-ranging application of the technology should be carefully considered, though.

=== Growth ===
Palmer amaranth may be the most aggressive pigweed species with respect to growth rate and competitive ability. Palmer amaranth in particular is highly competitive. It will outgrow cotton and is much more efficient. Growers of crops have not been able to provide adequate moisture to offset prolonged temperatures above 85 °F (29 °C) with a 112 °F (44 °C) heat index. In these conditions, many herbicides break down over time and Palmer amaranth will keep growing. It can grow from 2 to 5 inches (51 to 127 mm) in three days, or less. In only a few weeks, it can grow from 12 to 18 inches (300 to 460 mm) compared to cotton at 5 to 8 inches (130 to 200 mm).

=== Spread ===
Pollen is most commonly spread by wind. The male produces the pollen and the female plant produces the seed. The wind carries the pollen from resistant male plants to female plants. In addition, the seed is spread by traditional means, such as harvesting, inadequate cleaning of equipment, and the spreading of contaminated materials, such as manure.

In 2014, North Dakota State University's "ND Weed Control Guide" selected Amaranthus palmeri as "weed-of-the-year" to raise awareness about its "potentially devastating impact." In 2015, Palmer amaranth was chosen as "weed-of-the-year" for the second year in a row as a "proactive approach to prevent Palmer amaranth establishment in North Dakota." As alien, this species was first found in South Africa in March 2018, with further records in different regions of the country as well as in northern Botswana in March 2020. It is considered a naturalized weed which invades both ruderal and segetal (growing in cornfields) plant communities.
