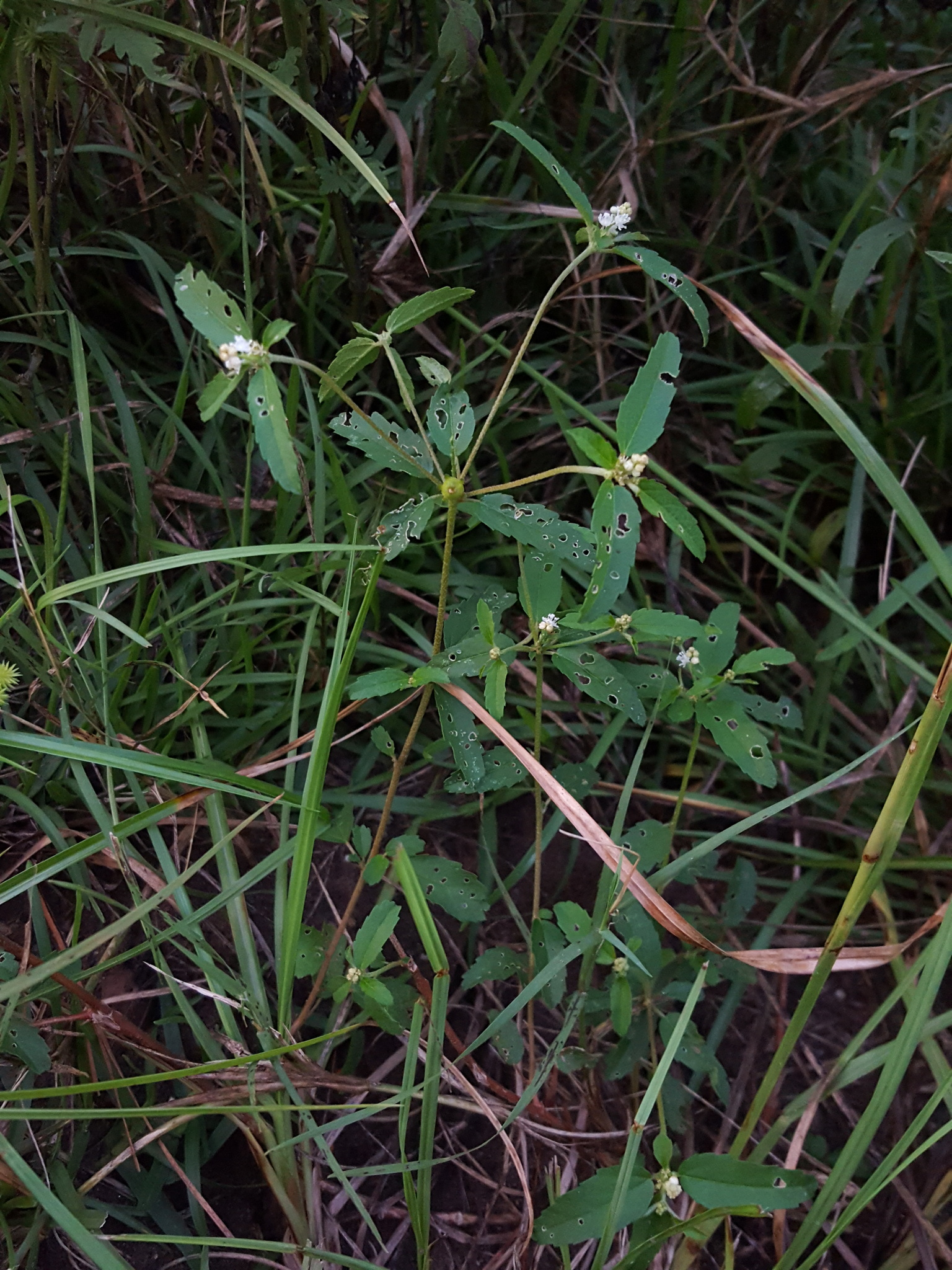

Conservation status
- Secure (NatureServe)

Scientific classification
- Kingdom: Plantae
- Clade: Embryophytes
- Clade: Tracheophytes
- Clade: Spermatophytes
- Clade: Angiosperms
- Clade: Eudicots
- Clade: Rosids
- Order: Malpighiales
- Family: Euphorbiaceae
- Genus: Croton
- Species: C. glandulosus

Binomial name
- Croton glandulosus L.

Varieties
- Croton glandulosus var. arenicola (Small) B.W.van Ee, P.E.Berry & Ginzbarg; Croton glandulosus var. floridanus (A.M.Ferguson) R.W.Long; Croton glandulosus var. glabratus Urb.; Croton glandulosus var. glandulosus; Croton glandulosus var. lindheimeri Müll.Arg.; Croton glandulosus var. pubentissimus Croizat; Croton glandulosus var. septentrionalis Müll.Arg.

= Croton glandulosus =

Species of plant

Croton glandulosus is a species of plant in the family Euphorbiaceae that has many common names such as vente conmigo, tooth-leaved croton, tropic croton and sand croton. The species's specific epithet, glandulosus, is due to the gland-like structures that appear at the end of the leaf stalk. C. glandulosus and various other species are found to be common weeds in gardens, crops, and lawns. This species in particular is highly problematic in crops such as cotton and peanuts in the Southeastern United States.

== Morphology ==
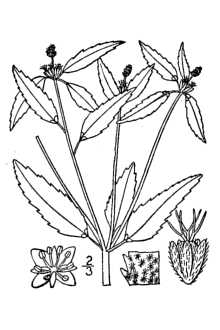
C. glandulosus

C. glandulosus is a weedy summer annual herbaceous plant, growing from 4 to 24 inches in height. It is characterized by a pungently fragrant tap root from which its stem grows, and also by stellate hairs and glands on its stem and leaves. The leaves are alternate and oval-shaped when young, but as they mature, they become more lance-shaped and elliptical. The edges of the leaves are serrated or toothed, which makes this species easy to identify. The leaves are located on small petioles, and have a white, oval-like gland on either side of the petiole as the it meets the stem. The leaves of the plant are whorled and they occur below the flowers. The greater and lesser surface of the leaf has small stellate hairs, and when the leaf is crushed, it gives off a unique odor.

Typically, the flowering season for the tropic croton is from July to October. It has white terminal flowers which are 4 or 5-parted, monoecious, and occur in racemose clusters at the ends of the plant's stems. Female flowers tend to have 4 sepals with 4 petals while males only have 5 sepals and no petals. The plant fruits from August to October and the fruit has a brown capsule of three chambers, having three seeds that are shiny, grayish-tan, stippled with black, and oval-shaped.

The seedling stems underneath the cotyledons, which are mostly cased with hairs that give off a star-shaped look. The cotyledons tend to be 5 to 7 mm long by 7 to 10 mm wide, dense, heart-shaped, and have palmate venation. Additionally, the first true leaves that emerge are toothed and egg-shaped.

=== Look-alikes ===
Tropic croton can easily be confused with Eclipta prostrata because of its similar appearance and structure. However, the leaves of Eclipta prostrata are more linear and arranged oppositely, whereas the leaves on the tropic croton are arranged alternately. The tropic croton can also be confused with Sida spinosa in terms of its growth patterns and appearance, but Sida spinosa lacks the disc-like glands that appear above and below the petiole, and the stellate pubescent hairs that are characteristic of tropic crotons. The seeds and flowers of Sida spinosa are also very different from the tropic croton due to the plants being in different families.

=== Varieties ===
Seven varieties are accepted.

- Croton glandulosus var. arenicola (Small) B.W.van Ee, P.E.Berry & Ginzbarg – South Florida
- Croton glandulosus var. floridanus (A.M.Ferguson) R.W.Long – Florida
- Croton glandulosus var. glabratus Urb. – Puerto Rico
- Croton glandulosus var. glandulosus – Mexico, Central America, the Caribbean, and tropical South America
- Croton glandulosus var. lindheimeri Müll.Arg. – southern Kansas to eastern Mexico
- Croton glandulosus var. pubentissimus Croizat – coastal Texas
- Croton glandulosus var. septentrionalis Müll.Arg. – central and eastern United States to northern and eastern Mexico

== Habitat and distribution ==
Tropic croton can be typically found in dry or sandy soil, fields, pastures, river terraces, cultivated fields, waste grounds, and along roadsides and railroads.

=== Distribution ===
Croton glandulosus can be found throughout the central and eastern United States, Central America, the Caribbean, and tropical South America. It is native to the south-central U.S. and is mostly prevalent in the coastal plain and Piedmont in Virginia, North Carolina, South Carolina, Tennessee, Georgia, Kentucky, Mississippi, Alabama, and Florida. It has even spread to regions as far north as Indiana and Iowa. It has been noted in New Jersey "along the railroad above Bishops Bridge" on a bed of "loose cinder railroad-ballast" and in Philadelphia.

=== As a weed ===
Much of its southeastern U.S. range is considered non-native or potentially non-native. This plant is becoming problematic for many agronomic crops such as corn, soybeans, cotton, and many others in southeast Virginia, North Carolina, Alabama, and Georgia.

The increasing prevalence of tropic croton in the Southeastern United States has had a negative effect on the growth of many crops. Although limited research has been conducted to study the competitiveness of tropic croton, multiple studies have shown the troublesome nature of this plant. Research illustrated that tropic croton is the third most problematic weed in peanuts and the fifth most troublesome weed in cotton. Possible reasons for its increasing prevalence and competitiveness are its ability to effectively release multiple mature seeds, which are quickly consumed by birds and thus are easily dispersed. Also, multiple herbicides that are used in cotton and peanuts are less effective on tropic croton, which further increases its occurrence.
