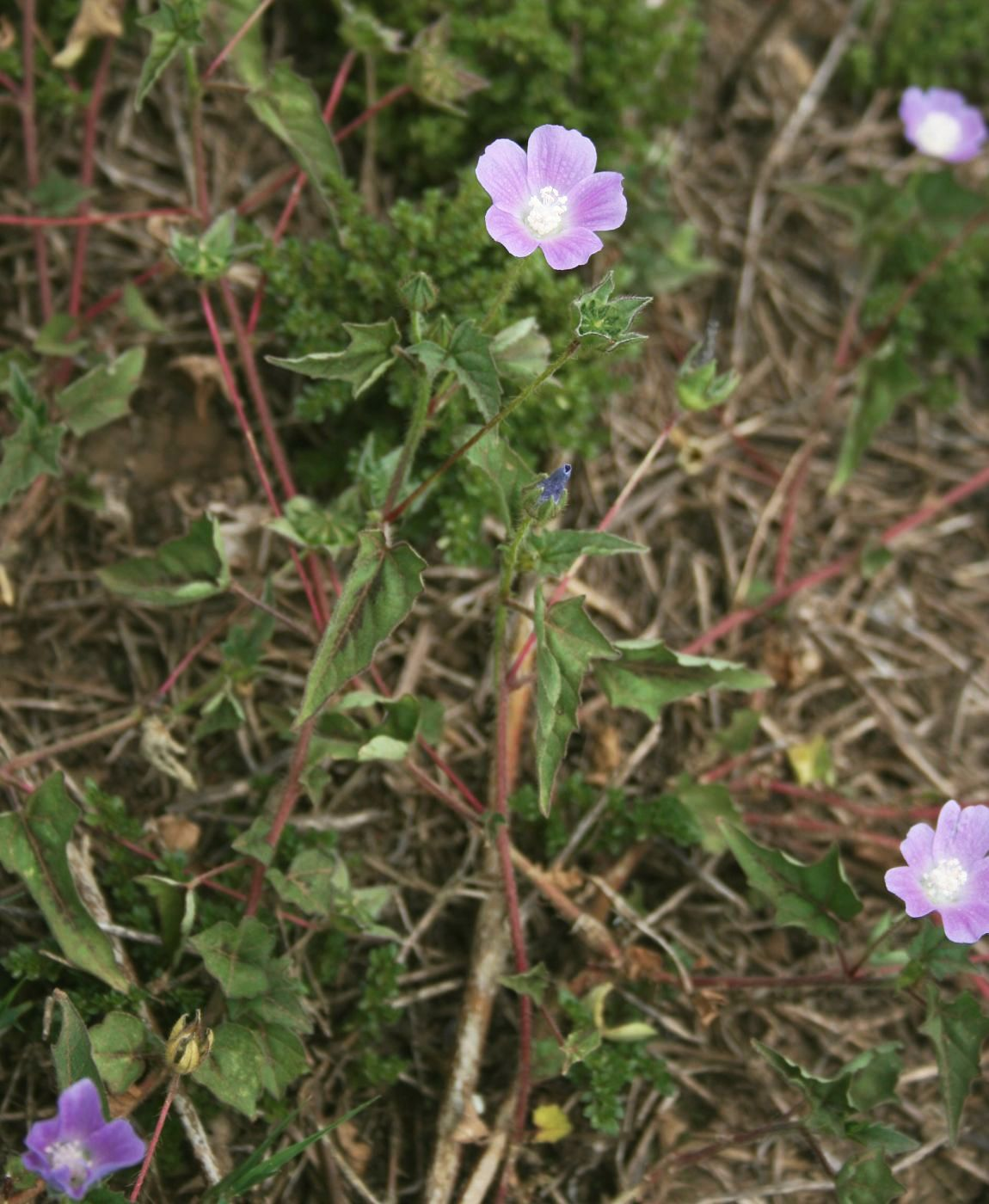
- Anoda cristata

Conservation status
- Secure (NatureServe)

Scientific classification
- Kingdom: Plantae
- Clade: Tracheophytes
- Clade: Angiosperms
- Clade: Eudicots
- Clade: Rosids
- Order: Malvales
- Family: Malvaceae
- Genus: Anoda
- Species: A. cristata

Binomial name
- Anoda cristata (L.) Schltdl.

Synonyms
- List: Anoda acerifolia var. minoriflora Hochr.; Anoda arizonica A.Gray; Anoda arizonica var. digitata A.Gray; Anoda brachyantha Rchb.; Anoda dilleniana Cav.; Anoda fernandeziana Steud.; Anoda hastata Cav.; Anoda incarnata Spreng. ex Steud.; Anoda lavateroides Medik.; Anoda populifolia Phil.; Anoda triangularis (Humb. & Bonpl. ex Willd.) DC.; Anoda triangularis var. digitata (A.Gray) B.L.Rob.; Anoda triloba Cav.; Cavanillea hastata (Cav.) Medik.; Sida centrota Spreng.; Sida cristata L.; Sida deltoidea Hornem.; Sida dilleniana (Cav.) Willd.; Sida hastata Sims; Sida hastata (Cav.) Willd.; Sida mexicana Scop.; Sida quinqueangulata D.Dietr.; Sida quinqueloba DC.; Sida quinqueloba Moc. & Sessé; Sida suberosa Steud.; Sida triangularis Humb. & Bonpl. ex Willd.

= Anoda cristata =

Plant species in the mallow family

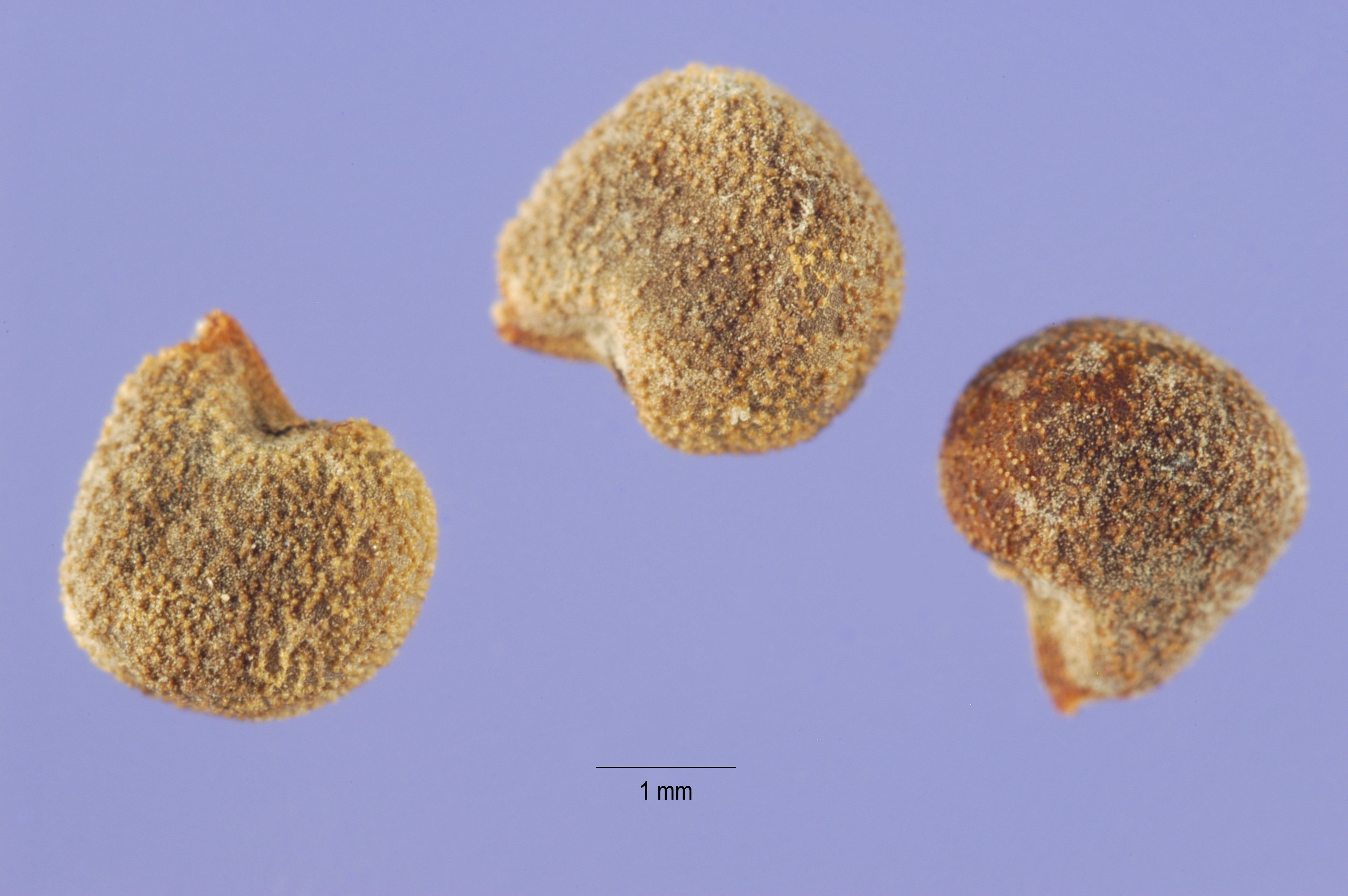
Seeds

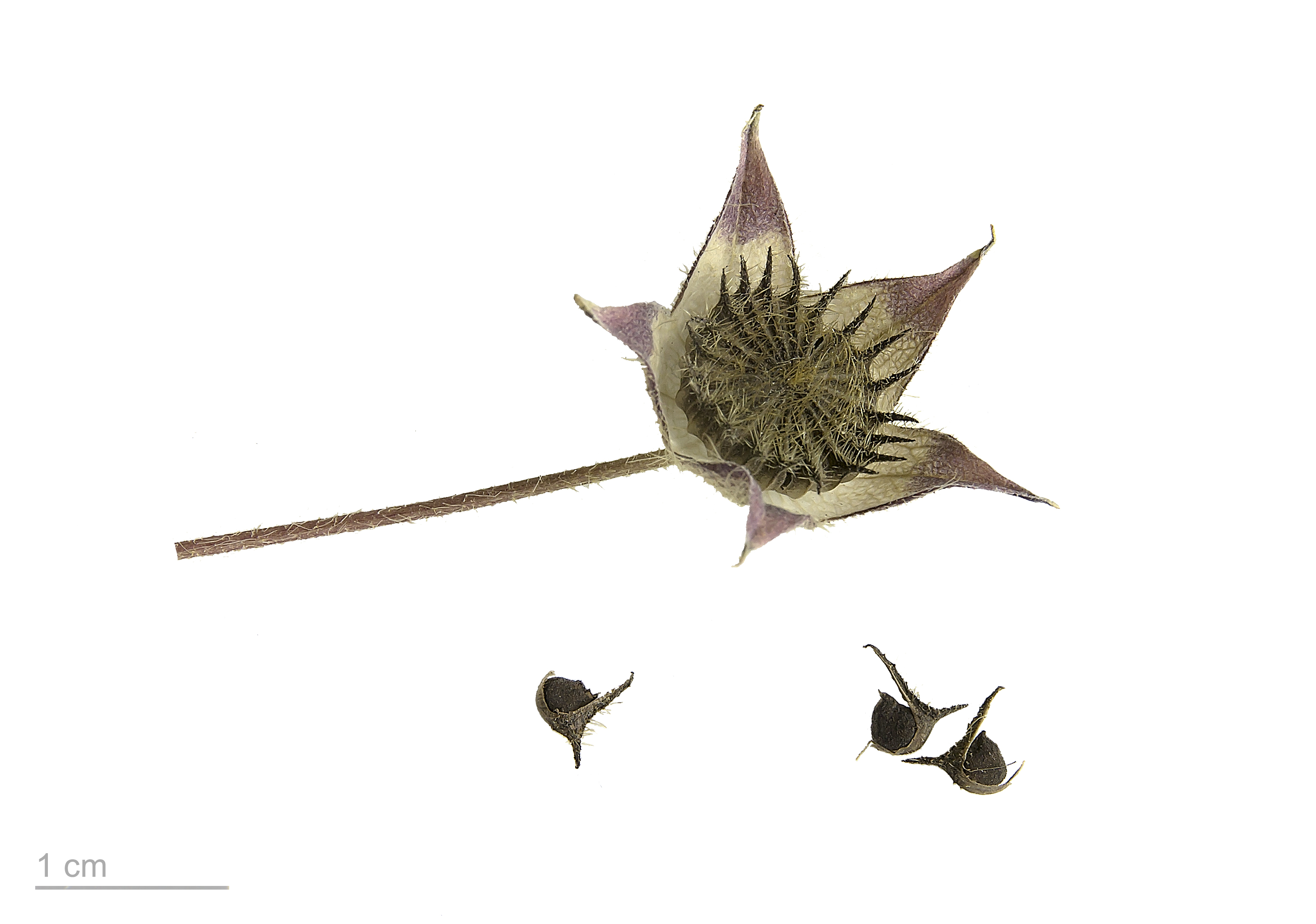
Anoda cristata - MHNT

Anoda cristata is a species of flowering plant in the mallow family known by many common names, including spurred anoda, crested anoda, and violettas. It is native to North and South America. It is known throughout the rest of the Americas as well as Australia as an introduced species and often a noxious weed. It has been found as a weed in Belgium. Naturally, it is often found near streams, in moist meadows, and in disturbed areas.

This is an annual herb reaching a maximum erect height between one half and one meter. The stem is ridged and branching. The plant is variable in morphology, especially in leaf shape, but leaves are usually somewhat triangular, and hairy. Solitary flowers grow in the leaf axils on long pedicels. The flower is 2 to 3 centimeters wide, with pointed green to reddish sepals and 5 petals, which may be blueish-purple or reddish-pink in color. The fruit is a bristly, disc-shaped capsule with 9 to 20 segments. Each segment produces a seed. This is sometimes an agricultural weed, especially of soybeans. It is tolerated as a weed of crop fields in parts of Mexico, and even fostered, because it is eaten and used as a source of medicinal remedies.
