= Nitrofen =

Names
- Preferred IUPAC name 2,4-Dichloro-1-(4-nitrophenoxy)benzene
- Other names Nitrophen; Nitrofene; 2,4-Dichlorophenyl 4-nitrophenyl ether

Identifiers
CAS Number	1836-75-5
3D model (JSmol)	Interactive image
ChemSpider	15010
ECHA InfoCard	100.015.824
PubChem CID	15787
UNII	N71UYG034A
CompTox Dashboard (EPA)	DTXSID7020970
- InChI: InChI=1S/C12H7Cl2NO3/c13-8-1-6-12(11(14)7-8)18-10-4-2-9(3-5-10)15(16)17/h1-7H Key: XITQUSLLOSKDTB-UHFFFAOYSA-N; InChI=1/C12H7Cl2NO3/c13-8-1-6-12(11(14)7-8)18-10-4-2-9(3-5-10)15(16)17/h1-7H Key: XITQUSLLOSKDTB-UHFFFAOYAU
- SMILES: Clc2cc(Cl)ccc2Oc1ccc([N+]([O-])=O)cc1

Properties
Chemical formula	C_{12}H_{7}Cl_{2}NO_{3}
Molar mass	284.09 g·mol^{−1}
Appearance	Colorless, crystalline solid
Density	1.80 g/cm^{3} at 83 °C
Melting point	64–71 °C (147–160 °F; 337–344 K) (technical)
Solubility in water	0.7-1.2 mg/L at 22 °C
- Except where otherwise noted, data are given for materials in their standard state (at 25 °C [77 °F], 100 kPa). Infobox references

Nitrofen is an herbicide of the diphenyl ether class. Because of concerns about its carcinogenicity, the use of nitrofen has been banned in the European Union and in the United States since 1996. It has been superseded by related protoporphyrinogen oxidase enzyme inhibitors including acifluorfen and fomesafen.

In 2002, Nitrofen was detected in organic feed, organic eggs, and organic poultry products in Germany prompting a scandal which caused a decline in all organic meat sales in Europe.

Nitrofen is an IARC Group 2B carcinogen, meaning it is "possibly carcinogenic to humans".

Microorganisms in sewage cometabolise nitrofen, trifluralin, fluchloralin and profluralin; i.e. enzymes from other active metabolic processes also break up these chemicals. Over 88 days, nitrofen levels reduced by 40% under aerobic conditions.

"Tok" was a commercial herbicide of nitrofen.
