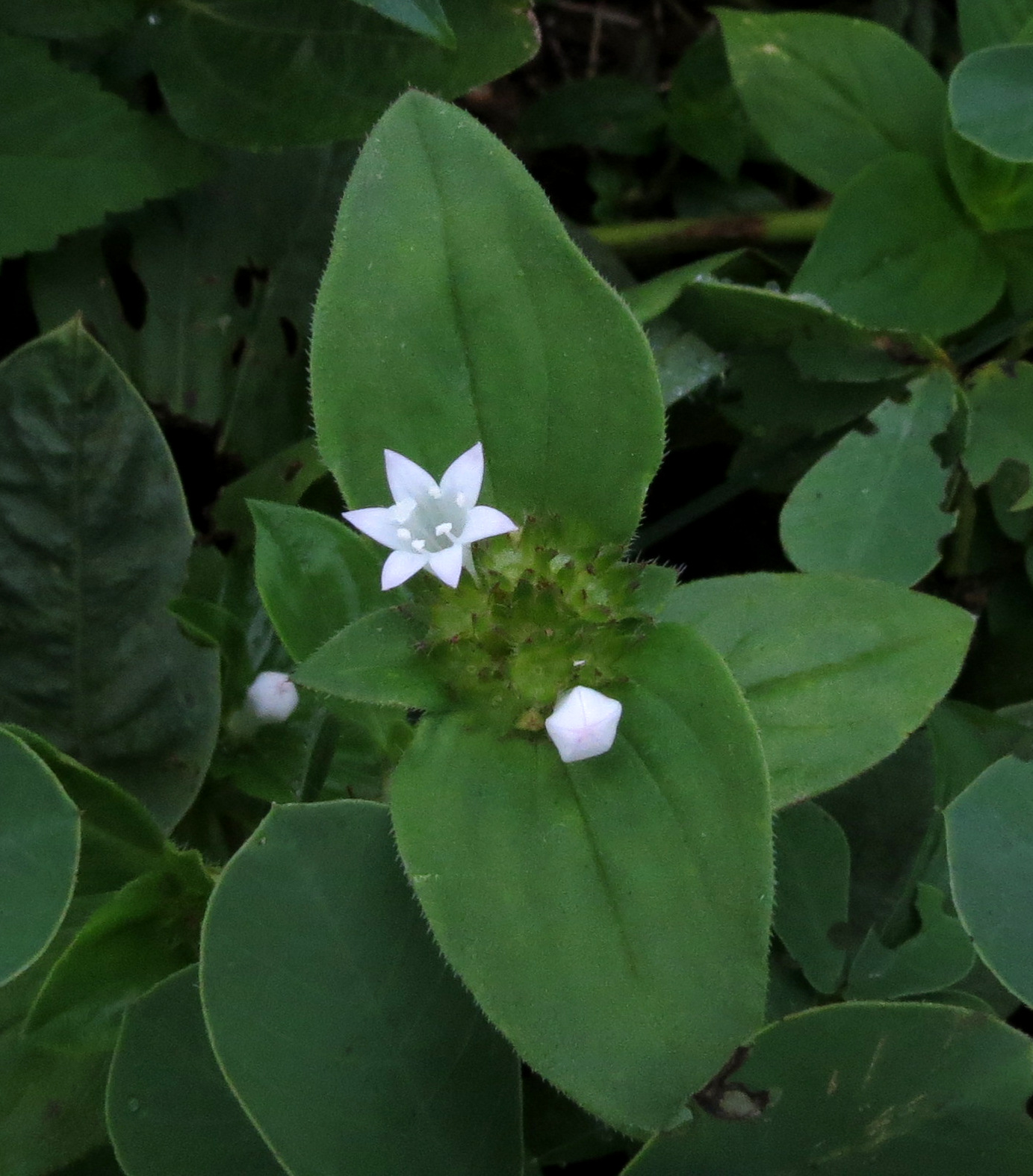

Scientific classification
- Kingdom: Plantae
- Clade: Tracheophytes
- Clade: Angiosperms
- Clade: Eudicots
- Clade: Asterids
- Order: Gentianales
- Family: Rubiaceae
- Genus: Richardia
- Species: R. scabra

Binomial name
- Richardia scabra L.

= Richardia scabra =

Species of plant

Richardia scabra, commonly called rough Mexican clover or Florida pusley, is a species of flowering plant in the family Rubiaceae. It is widespread, native to warm areas of both North America, South America and East African countries like in Central Kenya .

== Description ==
The stems of R. scabra may reach a height between 1 and 7 decimeters (4 to 27.5 inches). The leaves are oppositely arranged, and lanceolate to elliptic in shape. They range in size from 2.5 to 7 centimeters (1 to 2.75 inches) in length. Individuals produce white flowers, inflorescence beginning as early as March and may last through December. The fruit produced by R. scabra is leathery in texture and is 3 to 4 millimeters in length.

== Habitat ==
In the southeastern United States, this species is often found in disturbed habitats, with individuals observed in habitats such as along roadsides and within vacant lots.

Within the United States' Coastal Plain region, R. scabra occurs within environments that possess fine sandy loams with slow permeability. Individuals have been documented in habitats such as upland pine communities and woodlands.
