= List of compounds with carbon number 12 =

This is a partial list of molecules that contain 12 carbon atoms.

== C_{12}H_{0} – C_{12}H_{8} ==
| Chemical formula | Synonyms | CAS number |
|---|---|---|
| C_{12}Cl_{10} | decachlorobiphenyl | 2051-24-3 |
| C_{12}F_{18} | perfluorohexamethyl dewar benzene | 23174-55-2 |
| C_{12}F_{18} | perfluorohexamethylprismane | 22736-20-5 |
| C_{12}F_{18} | perfluorohxamethyl benzvalene | 22186-64-7 |
| C_{12}F_{20} | perfluorodimethyldecahydronaphthalene | 54471-59-9 |
| C_{12}F_{22} | docosafluorobicyclohexyl | 558-64-5 |
| C_{12}F_{27}N | perfluorotributylamine | 311-89-7 |
| C_{12}Br_{10}O | decabromodiphenyl ether | 1163-19-5 |
| C_{12}Cl_{10} | decachlorobiphenyl | 2051-24-3 |
| C_{12}H_{2}Br_{8}O | octabromodiphenyl ether | 32536-52-0 |
| C_{12}Fe_{3}O_{12} | triiron dodecacarbonyl | 17685-52-8 |
| C_{12}H_{3}Br_{7}O | heptabromodiphenyl ester | 189084-67-1 |
| C_{12}H_{4}Cl_{2}F_{6}N_{4}OS | fipronil | 120068-37-3 |
| C_{12}H_{4}Cl_{4}O_{2} | 2,3,7,8-Tetrachlorodibenzodioxin | 1746-01-6 |
| C_{12}H_{5}Br_{5}O | pentabromodiphenyl ether | 32534-81-9 |
| C_{12}H_{5}MoNO_{5} | isocyanobenzenemolybdenum pentacarbonyl | 80642-45-1 |
| C_{12}H_{5}NO_{5}W | isocyanobenzenetungsten pentacarbonyl | 15612-93-8 |
| C_{12}H_{5}N_{7}O_{12} | dipicrylamine | 131-73-7 |
| C_{12}H_{6}Cl_{3}NO_{3} | chlornitrofen | 1836-77-7 |
| C_{12}H_{6}Cl_{4}OS | tetrasul sulfoxide | 35850-29-4 |
| C_{12}H_{6}Cl_{4}O_{2}S | bithionol | 97-18-7 |
| C_{12}H_{6}F_{6} | benzene:hexafluorobenzene complex | 783-33-5 |
| C_{12}H_{6}O_{12} | benzenehexacarboxylic acid | 517-60-2 |
| C_{12}H_{8} | acenaphthylene | 208-96-8 |
| C_{12}H_{8} | biphenylene | 259-79-0 |
| C_{12}H_{8}Cl_{6} | aldrin | 309-00-2 |
| C_{12}H_{8}Cl_{6}O | endrin | 72-20-8 |
| C_{12}H_{8}N_{2} | phenazine | 92-82-0 |
| C_{12}H_{8}O | capillin | 495-74-9 |
| C_{12}H_{8}O | dibenzofuran | 132-64-9 |
| C_{12}H_{8}OS | phenoxathiin | 262-20-4 |
| C_{12}H_{8}OSe | phenoxaselenin | 262-22-6 |
| C_{12}H_{8}OTe | phenoxatellurin | 262-24-8 |
| C_{12}H_{8}O_{2}S | dibenzothiophene sulfone | 1016-05-3 |
| C_{12}H_{8}S | dibenzothiophene | 132-65-0 |
| C_{12}H_{8}S_{2} | diphenylene disulfide | 230-26-2 |
| C_{12}H_{8}S_{2} | thianthrene | 92-85-3 |
| C_{12}H_{8}Se | dibenzoselenophene | 244-95-1 |
| C_{12}H_{8}Se_{2} | selenanthrene | 262-30-6 |
| C_{12}H_{8}Te | dibenzotellurophene | 244-98-4 |

== C_{12}H_{9} – C_{12}H_{11} ==
| C_{12}H_{9}N_{3}O_{4} | azo violet | |
| C_{12}H_{9}ClF_{3}N_{3}O | norflurazon | 27314-13-2 |
| C_{12}H_{9}Cl_{2}NO_{3} | vinclozoline | 50471-44-8 |
| C_{12}H_{9}N | carbazole | 86-74-8 |
| C_{12}H_{9}NO | phenoxazine | 135-67-1 |
| C_{12}H_{9}NS | phenothiazine | 92-84-2 |
| C_{12}H_{9}P | 1-phosphaphenalene | 1585965-09-8 |
| C_{12}H_{9}P | 9b-phosphaphenalene | 25043-12-3 |
| C_{12}H_{10} | acenaphthene | 83-32-9 |
| C_{12}H_{10} | benzocyclooctatetraene | 265-49-6 |
| C_{12}H_{10} | biphenyl | 92-52-4 |
| C_{12}H_{10} | elassovalene | 38310-40-6 |
| C_{12}H_{10} | heptalene | 257-24-9 |
| C_{12}H_{10}Be | diphenylberyllium | 22300-89-6 |
| C_{12}H_{10}BrP | bromodiphenylphosphine | 1079-65-8 |
| C_{12}H_{10}ClOP | diphenylphosphinic chloride | 1499-21-4 |
| C_{12}H_{10}ClO_{3}P | diphenyl chlorophosphate | 2524-64-3 |
| C_{12}H_{10}ClP | chlorodiphenylphosphine | 1079-66-9 |
| C_{12}H_{10}Cl_{2}Si | diphenyldichlorosilane | 80-10-4 |
| C_{12}H_{10}N_{2} | azobenzene | 103-33-3 |
| C_{12}H_{10}N_{2}O | azoxybenzene | 495-48-7 |
| C_{12}H_{10}N_{2}O | phenacyl pyrazine | 40061-45-8 |
| C_{12}H_{10}N_{2}O_{2} | nitrosobenzene dimer | 35506-28-6 |
| C_{12}H_{10}N_{3}O_{3}P | diphenylphosphoryl azide | 26386-88-9 |
| C_{12}H_{10}O | diphenyl ether | 101-84-8 |
| C_{12}H_{10}OS | diphenyl sulfoxide | 945-51-7 |
| C_{12}H_{10}O_{2} | phenyl hydroquinone | 1079-21-6 |
| C_{12}H_{10}O_{2}S | diphenyl sulfone | 127-63-9 |
| C_{12}H_{10}O_{3}S_{2} | phenyl benzenesulfinyl sulfone | 784-81-6 |
| C_{12}H_{10}O_{4} | quinhydrone | 106-34-3 |
| C_{12}H_{10}O_{4}S_{2} | diphenyl disulfone | 10409-06-0 |
| C_{12}H_{10}O_{8} | dimethyl pyromellitate | 39900-53-3 |
| C_{12}H_{10}S | diphenyl sulfide | 139-66-2 |
| C_{12}H_{10}SSn | diphenyl tin sulfide | 20332-10-9 |
| C_{12}H_{10}Te | diphenyl telluride | 1202-36-4 |
| C_{12}H_{11}ClN_{2}O_{5}S | furosemide | 54-31-9 |
| C_{12}H_{11}ClSi | diphenylchlorosilane | 1631-83-0 |
| C_{12}H_{11}Cl_{2}NO | propyzamide | 23950-58-5 |
| C_{12}H_{11}CrNO_{5} | isocyanocyclohexanechromium pentacarbonyl | 19706-05-9 |
| C_{12}H_{11}MoNO_{5} | isocyanocyclobexanemolybdenum pentacarbonyl | 15603-76-6 |
| C_{12}H_{11}N | diphenylamine | 122-39-4 |
| C_{12}H_{11}NO_{2} | carbaril | 63-25-2 |
| C_{12}H_{11}NO_{4}S_{2} | dibenzenesulfonamide | 2618-96-4 |
| C_{12}H_{11}NO_{5}W | isocyanocyclohexanetungsten pentacarbonyl | 15603-77-7 |
| C_{12}H_{11}N_{2}P | phenyl phosphazoanilide | 5679-59-4 |
| C_{12}H_{11}O_{2}P | diphenyl phosphinic acid | 1707-03-5 |
| C_{12}H_{11}O_{3}P | diphenyl hydrogen phosphite | 4712-55-4 |
| C_{12}H_{11}PS_{2} | diphenylphosphinodithioic acid | 1015-38-9 |
| C_{12}H_{11}PO_{4} | diphenylphosphate | 838-85-7 |

== C_{12}H_{12} – C_{12}H_{14} ==
| C_{12}H_{12} | dimethylnaphthalene | 28804-88-8 |
| C_{12}H_{12} | tricyclobutabenzene (rarely tricyclobutenobenzene) | 60323-52-6 |
| C_{12}H_{12}Fe | vinylferrocene | 1271-51-8 |
| C_{12}H_{12}FeO | acetylferrocene | 1271-55-2 |
| C_{12}H_{12}Ge | diphenylgermane | 1675-58-7 |
| C_{12}H_{12}N_{2} | benzidine | 92-87-5 |
| C_{12}H_{12}N_{2}O_{2}S | dapsone | 80-08-0 |
| C_{12}H_{12}O | butyrylphenylacetylene | 14252-32-5 |
| C_{12}H_{12}O_{2} | allyl cinnamate | 1866-31-5 |
| C_{12}H_{12}O_{2}Si | diphenyl silanediol | 947-42-2 |
| C_{12}H_{12}O_{5} | howflex gbp | 13988-26-6 |
| C_{12}H_{12}O_{12} | cyclohexanehexacarboxylic acid | 2216-84-4 |
| C_{12}H_{13}ClF_{3}N_{3}O_{4} | fluchloralin | 33245-39-5 |
| C_{12}H_{13}ClN_{2}O | buturon | 3766-60-7 |
| C_{12}H_{13}ClN_{4} | pyrimethamine | 58-14-0 |
| C_{12}H_{13}Cl_{2}NO_{2} | bixlozone | 81777-95-9 |
| C_{12}H_{13}NO_{2}S | carboxin | 5234-68-4 |
| C_{12}H_{13}NO_{4}S | oxycarboxin | 5259-88-1 |
| C_{12}H_{13}N_{3}O_{2} | isocarboxazid | 59-63-2 |
| C_{12}H_{13}N_{3}O_{2} | triaziquone | 68-76-8 |
| C_{12}H_{14}ClNO_{2} | dimethazone | 81777-89-1 |
| C_{12}H_{14}Cl_{3}O_{4}P | clofenvinfos | 470-90-6 |
| C_{12}H_{14}CrO_{3}Si | trimethylsilylbenzenechromium tricarbonyl | 33248-13-4 |
| C_{12}H_{14}N_{2} | paraquat | 4685-14-7 |
| C_{12}H_{14}N_{2} | altinicline | 179120-92-4 |
| C_{12}H_{14}N_{2}O_{2} | mephenytoin | 50-12-4 |
| C_{12}H_{14}N_{2}O_{2} | primidone | 125-33-7 |
| C_{12}H_{14}N_{4}O_{2}S | sulfamethazine | 57-68-1 |
| C_{12}H_{14}N_{4}O_{2}S | sulfisomidine | 515-64-0 |
| C_{12}H_{14}O_{2} | benzyl tiglate | 37526-88-8 |
| C_{12}H_{14}O_{2} | butylphthalide | 6066-49-5 |
| C_{12}H_{14}O_{2} | phenylethyl methacrylate | 3683-12-3 |
| C_{12}H_{14}O_{2} | precocene i | 17598-02-6 |
| C_{12}H_{14}O_{4} | apiol | 523-80-8 |
| C_{12}H_{14}O_{4} | diethyl phthalate | 84-66-2 |
| C_{12}H_{14}O_{4} | dillapiole | 484-31-1 |
| C_{12}H_{14}O_{4} | methyl benzyl succinate | 119450-11-2 |

== C_{12}H_{15} – C_{12}H_{17} ==
| C_{12}H_{15}Cl_{2}NO | karsil | 2533-89-3 |
| C_{12}H_{15}ClNO_{4}PS_{2} | phosalone | 2310-17-0 |
| C_{12}H_{15}ClO_{3} | clofibrate | 637-07-0 |
| C_{12}H_{15}F_{5}OSi | isobutanol dmpfps | 71338-75-5 |
| C_{12}H_{15}N | julolidine | 479-59-4 |
| C_{12}H_{15}NO_{2} | phenylaminoethyl methacrylate | 19288-59-6 |
| C_{12}H_{15}NO_{2} | 2C-YN | 752982-24-4 |
| C_{12}H_{15}NO_{3} | anhalonine | 519-04-0 |
| C_{12}H_{15}NO_{3} | carbofuran | 1563-66-2 |
| C_{12}H_{15}NO_{3} | hydrocotarnine | 550-10-7 |
| C_{12}H_{15}NO_{3} | metaxalone | 1665-48-1 |
| C_{12}H_{15}NO_{4} | cotarmine | 82-54-2 |
| C_{12}H_{15}N_{2}O_{3}PS | phoxim | 14816-18-3 |
| C_{12}H_{15}N_{2}O_{3}PS | quinalphos | 13593-03-8 |
| C_{12}H_{15}N_{3}O | noramidopyrine | 519-98-2 |
| C_{12}H_{16} | cyclohexylbenzene | 827-52-1 |
| C_{12}H_{16}ClNOS | benthiocarb | 28249-77-6 |
| C_{12}H_{16}ClNO_{3} | anhalonine hydrochloride | 35646-05-0 |
| C_{12}H_{16}ClNO_{3} | meclofenoxate | 51-68-3 |
| C_{12}H_{16}N_{2} | etryptamine | 2235-90-7 |
| C_{12}H_{16}N_{2}O | bufotenin | 487-93-4 |
| C_{12}H_{16}N_{2}O | piperidyl formanilide | 2645-36-5 |
| C_{12}H_{16}N_{2}O | psilocin | 520-53-6 |
| C_{12}H_{16}N_{2}O_{3} | cyclobarbital | 52-31-3 |
| C_{12}H_{16}N_{2}O_{3} | hexobarbital | 56-29-1 |
| C_{12}H_{16}N_{3}O_{3}PS | triazophos | 24017-47-8 |
| C_{12}H_{16}O | benzyl isobutyl ketone | 5349-62-2 |
| C_{12}H_{16}O | pentamethylbenzaldehyde | 17432-38-1 |
| C_{12}H_{16}O_{2} | dimethylbenzylcarbinyl acetate | 151-05-3 |
| C_{12}H_{16}O_{2} | pentamethylbenzoic acid | 2243-32-5 |
| C_{12}H_{16}O_{3} | amyl salicylate | 2050-08-0 |
| C_{12}H_{16}O_{3} | anisyl butyrate | 6963-56-0 |
| C_{12}H_{16}O_{3} | isoelemicin | 5273-85-8 |
| C_{12}H_{17}BrN_{2}O_{3} | sigmodal | 1216-40-6 |
| C_{12}H_{17}NO | diethyltoluamide | 134-62-3 |
| C_{12}H_{17}NO | hexananilide | 621-15-8 |
| C_{12}H_{17}NOS | tiletamine | 14176-49-9 |
| C_{12}H_{17}NO_{3} | anhalonidine | 17627-77-9 |
| C_{12}H_{17}NO_{3} | butoxyethyl nicotinate | 13912-80-6 |
| C_{12}H_{17}N_{2}O_{4}P | psilocybin | 520-52-5 |
| C_{12}H_{17}O_{4}P | diethyl benzoylmethylphosphonate | 3453-00-7 |
| C_{12}H_{17}O_{4}PS_{2} | phenthoate | 2597-03-7 |

== C_{12}H_{18} – C_{12}H_{19} ==
| C_{12}H_{18}Be_{4}O_{13} | beryllium oxyacetate | 19049-40-2 |
| C_{12}H_{18}N_{2}O | isoproturon | 34123-59-6 |
| C_{12}H_{18}N_{2}O_{2} | nicametate | 3099-52-3 |
| C_{12}H_{18}N_{2}O_{2}S | thiamylal | 77-27-0 |
| C_{12}H_{18}N_{2}O_{3} | nealbarbital | 561-83-1 |
| C_{12}H_{18}N_{2}O_{3} | secobarbital | 76-73-3 |
| C_{12}H_{18}N_{2}O_{5} | galactose phenylhydrazone | 18841-76-4 |
| C_{12}H_{18}N_{2}O_{5} | glucose phenylhydrazone | 3713-25-5 |
| C_{12}H_{18}N_{4}O_{6}S | oryzalin | 19044-88-3 |
| C_{12}H_{18}O | benzyl isopentyl ether | 122-73-6 |
| C_{12}H_{18}O | 2-cyclohexylidenecyclohexanone | 1011-12-7 |
| C_{12}H_{18}O | hexylphenyl ether | 1132-66-7 |
| C_{12}H_{18}O | isobutylbenzylcarbinol | 7779-78-4 |
| C_{12}H_{18}O_{2} | acetophenone diethyl ketal | 4316-37-4 |
| C_{12}H_{18}O_{2} | argentilactone | 64543-31-3 |
| C_{12}H_{18}O_{2} | carvyl acetate | 97-42-7 |
| C_{12}H_{18}O_{2} | hexylresorcinol | 136-77-6 |
| C_{12}H_{18}O_{2} | lyratyl acetate | 79549-21-6 |
| C_{12}H_{18}O_{2} | myrtenyl acetate | 1079-01-2 |
| C_{12}H_{18}O_{2} | perillyl acetate | 15111-96-3 |
| C_{12}H_{18}O_{4} | dibutyl squarate | 2892-62-8 |
| C_{12}H_{18}O_{4}S_{2} | isoprothiolane | 50512-35-1 |
| C_{12}H_{19}ClNO_{3}P | crufomate | 299-86-5 |
| C_{12}H_{19}N | isopropylamphetamine | 33236-69-0 |
| C_{12}H_{19}NO | etafedrine | 48141-64-6 |
| C_{12}H_{19}NO | ethylephedrine | 1322-32-3 |
| C_{12}H_{19}NO_{2} | anilinoacetaldehyde diethyl acetal | 22758-34-5 |
| C_{12}H_{19}NO_{2} | bamethan | 3703-79-5 |
| C_{12}H_{19}NO_{3} | trimethoxyamphetamine | 1083-09-6 |
| C_{12}H_{19}NO_{4} | BOM (psychedelic) | 98537-40-1 |
| C_{12}H_{19}N_{3}O | procarbazine | 671-16-9 |
| C_{12}H_{19}O_{2}P | diisopropyl phenylphosphonite | 36238-99-0 |

== C_{12}H_{20} – C_{12}H_{21} ==
| C_{12}H_{20} | cyclododecyne | 1129-90-4 |
| C_{12}H_{20} | cyclohexylidenecyclohexane | 4233-18-5 |
| C_{12}H_{20}Cr_{2}O_{8} | dichromium tetrapropionate | 88814-72-6 |
| C_{12}H_{20}N_{2}O | ammodendrine | 494-15-5 |
| C_{12}H_{20}N_{2}O_{2} | decamethylene diisocyanate | 4538-39-0 |
| C_{12}H_{20}N_{2}O_{2}S_{2} | methitural | 467-43-6 |
| C_{12}H_{20}N_{2}O_{3}S | sotalol | 3930-20-9 |
| C_{12}H_{20}N_{4}OS | isomethiozin | 57052-04-7 |
| C_{12}H_{20}N_{6}O_{7} | hexaglycine | 3887-13-6 |
| C_{12}H_{20}O_{2} | bornyl acetate | 76-49-3 |
| C_{12}H_{20}O_{2} | ethyl chrysanthemate | 97-41-6 |
| C_{12}H_{20}O_{2} | isobornyl acetate | 125-12-2 |
| C_{12}H_{20}O_{2} | isopulegyl acetate | 89-49-6 |
| C_{12}H_{20}O_{2} | myrcenyl acetate | 1118-39-4 |
| C_{12}H_{20}O_{2} | terpinenyl acetate | 8007-35-0 |
| C_{12}H_{20}O_{3}Si | triethoxyphenylsilane | 780-69-8 |
| C_{12}H_{20}O_{4} | diisobutylfomarate | 7283-69-4 |
| C_{12}H_{20}O_{4} | traumatic acid | 6402-36-4 |
| C_{12}H_{20}O_{6} | diacetone sorbose | 32717-65-0 |
| C_{12}H_{20}O_{7} | ethyl citrate | 77-93-0 |
| C_{12}H_{21}Cl_{3}O_{2} | decyl trichloroacetate | 65611-33-8 |
| C_{12}H_{21}N_{2}O_{3}PS | dimpylate | 333-41-5 |
| C_{12}H_{21}N_{2}O_{4}P | diazinon oxon | 962-58-3 |

== C_{12}H_{22} ==
| C_{12}H_{22} | cyclododecene | 1501-82-2 |
| C_{12}H_{22} | cyclopentylcycloheptane | 42347-48-8 |
| C_{12}H_{22}Cl_{2}O_{2} | decyl dichloroacetate | 83005-00-9 |
| C_{12}H_{22}N_{2}O | dicyclohexyl nitrosamine | 947-92-2 |
| C_{12}H_{22}N_{2}O_{2} | crotetamide | 6168-76-9 |
| C_{12}H_{22}O | cyclododecanone | 830-13-7 |
| C_{12}H_{22}O | dicyclohexyl ether | 4645-15-2 |
| C_{12}H_{22}O | geosmin | 19700-21-1 |
| C_{12}H_{22}O_{2} | γ dodecalactone | 2305-05-7 |
| C_{12}H_{22}O_{2} | allyl nonanoate | 7493-72-3 |
| C_{12}H_{22}O_{2} | carvomenthyl acetate | 5256-66-6 |
| C_{12}H_{22}O_{2} | citronellyl acetate | 150-84-5 |
| C_{12}H_{22}O_{2} | cycloundecanecarboxylic acid | 831-67-4 |
| C_{12}H_{22}O_{2} | dihydromyrcenyl acetate | 88969-41-9 |
| C_{12}H_{22}O_{2} | dihydroterpinyl acetate | 80-25-1 |
| C_{12}H_{22}O_{2} | dodecanolactone | 947-05-7 |
| C_{12}H_{22}O_{2} | isomenthyl acetate | 20777-45-1 |
| C_{12}H_{22}O_{2} | menthyl acetate | 29066-34-0 |
| C_{12}H_{22}O_{2} | menthyl acetate | 89-48-5 |
| C_{12}H_{22}O_{2} | neomenthyl acetate | 2230-87-7 |
| C_{12}H_{22}O_{2} | nonyl acrylate | 2664-55-3 |
| C_{12}H_{22}O_{2} | octyl methacrylate | 688-84-6 |
| C_{12}H_{22}O_{2} | vinyl decanoate | 4704-31-8 |
| C_{12}H_{22}O_{4} | decanedioic acid monoethyl ester | 693-55-0 |
| C_{12}H_{22}O_{4} | dibutyl succinate | 141-03-7 |
| C_{12}H_{22}O_{4} | diethyl suberate | 2050-23-9 |
| C_{12}H_{22}O_{4} | diisoamyl oxalate | 2051-00-5 |
| C_{12}H_{22}O_{4} | dodecanedioic acid | 693-23-2 |
| C_{12}H_{22}O_{4} | tetraethylsuccinic acid | 4111-60-8 |
| C_{12}H_{22}O_{6} | dibutyl tartrate | 87-92-3 |
| C_{12}H_{22}O_{6} | oligoethylene butylene glycol adipate | 26570-73-0 |
| C_{12}H_{22}O_{11} | cellobiose | 528-50-7 |
| C_{12}H_{22}O_{11} | gentiobiose | 554-91-6 |
| C_{12}H_{22}O_{11} | maltose | 69-79-4 |
| C_{12}H_{22}O_{11} | melibiose | 5340-95-4 |
| C_{12}H_{22}O_{11} | sucrose | 57-50-1 |
| C_{12}H_{22}O_{12} | lactobionic acid | 96-82-2 |
| C_{12}H_{22}S | dicyclohexylsulfide | 7133-46-2 |

== C_{12}H_{23} – C_{12}H_{27} ==
| C_{12}H_{23}BrO_{2} | decyl bromoacetate | 5436-93-1 |
| C_{12}H_{23}Cl | chlorocyclododecane | 34039-83-3 |
| C_{12}H_{23}ClO | dodecanoyl chloride | 112-16-3 |
| C_{12}H_{23}N | dodecanenitrile | 2437-25-4 |
| C_{12}H_{23}NS | undecyl isothiocyanate | 19010-96-9 |
| C_{12}H_{24} | cyclododecane | 294-62-2 |
| C_{12}H_{24} | hexamethylcyclohexane | 51345-51-8 |
| C_{12}H_{24} | triisobutylene | 7756-94-7 |
| C_{12}H_{24}N_{2}O_{2} | dicyclohexyl ammonium nitrite | 3129-91-7 |
| C_{12}H_{24}N_{2}O_{4} | carisoprodol | 78-44-4 |
| C_{12}H_{24}O | cyclododecanol | 1724-39-6 |
| C_{12}H_{24}O | dodecanal | 112-54-9 |
| C_{12}H_{24}O_{2} | butyl caprylate | 589-75-3 |
| C_{12}H_{24}O_{2} | dipentylacetic acid | 5422-52-6 |
| C_{12}H_{24}O_{2} | dodecanoic acid | 143-07-7 |
| C_{12}H_{24}O_{2} | isolauric acid | 2724-56-3 |
| C_{12}H_{24}O_{2} | nonyl propionate | 53184-67-1 |
| C_{12}H_{24}O_{2} | pentyl heptanoate | 7493-82-5 |
| C_{12}H_{24}O_{2} | tetrahydrogeranyl acetate | 20780-49-8 |
| C_{12}H_{24}O_{2} | tetrahydrolinalyl acetate | 20780-48-7 |
| C_{12}H_{24}O_{3} | dodecaneperoxoic acid | 2388-12-7 |
| C_{12}H_{24}O_{4}Sn | dibutyltin diacetate | 1067-33-0 |
| C_{12}H_{24}O_{12} | lactose monohydrate | 64044-51-5 |
| C_{12}H_{25}N | cyclododecylamine | 1502-03-0 |
| C_{12}H_{25}NO | dodecanamide | 1120-16-7 |
| C_{12}H_{26} | dodecane | 112-40-3 |
| C_{12}H_{26}O | butyl octyl ether | 53839-23-9 |
| C_{12}H_{26}O_{3} | hydroxycitronellal dimethyl acetal | 141-92-4 |
| C_{12}H_{26}O_{5} | tetrapropylene glycol | 30242-05-8 |
| C_{12}H_{26}O_{5} | tetrapropylene glycol | 25657-08-3 |
| C_{12}H_{26}O_{6}P_{2}S_{4} | dioxathion | 78-34-2 |
| C_{12}H_{26}O_{7} | hexaethylene glycol | 2615-15-8 |
| C_{12}H_{26}S_{2} | dihexyl disulfide | 10496-15-8 |
| C_{12}H_{27}B | tributylborane | 122-56-5 |
| C_{12}H_{27}BO_{3} | tributylborate | 688-74-4 |
| C_{12}H_{27}ClSi | chlorotributylsilane | 995-45-9 |
| C_{12}H_{27}N | dihexylamine | 143-16-8 |
| C_{12}H_{27}N | tributylamine | 102-82-9 |
| C_{12}H_{27}N | triisobutylamine | 1116-40-1 |
| C_{12}H_{27}N_{3}Sn | tributyltin azide | 17846-68-3 |
| C_{12}H_{27}O_{4}P | triisobutyl phosphate | 126-71-6 |
| C_{12}H_{27}P | triisobutylphosphine | 4125-25-1 |
| C_{12}H_{27}PS_{3} | tributyl phosphorotrithioite | 150-50-5 |

== C_{12}H_{28} – C_{12}H_{many} ==
| C_{12}H_{28}BF_{4}N | tetrapropylammonium tetrafluoroborate | 15553-52-3 |
| C_{12}H_{28}Ge | tetrapropyl germane | 994-65-0 |
| C_{12}H_{28}N_{2} | tetrapropylhydrazine | 60678-69-5 |
| C_{12}H_{28}OSi | hexyloxytriethylsilane | 18107-40-9 |
| C_{12}H_{28}O_{4}Si | tetraisopropoxysilane | 1992-48-9 |
| C_{12}H_{28}O_{4}Si | tetrapropyl silicate | 682-01-9 |
| C_{12}H_{30}OSi_{2} | hexaethyldisiloxane | 994-49-0 |
| C_{12}H_{36}ClCr_{3}O_{22} | triaquo hexacetate chromate chloride hexahydrate | 12366-60-8 |
| C_{12}H_{36}Li_{4}Si_{4} | trimethylsilyllithium tetramer | 18000-27-6 |
| C_{12}H_{36}O_{4}Si_{5} | dodecamethylpentasiloxane | 141-63-9 |
| C_{12}H_{36}O_{6}Si_{6} | dodecamethylcyclohexasiloxane | 540-97-6 |
| C_{12}N_{6} | hexacyanobenzene radical | 1217-44-3 |
| C_{12}O_{12}Os_{3} | triosmium dodecacarbonyl | 15696-40-9 |

== See also ==
- Carbon number
- List of compounds with carbon number 11
- List of compounds with carbon number 13
