= List of compounds with carbon number 11 =

This is a partial list of molecules that contain 11 carbon atoms.

Chemical formula	Synonyms	CAS number
C_{11}H_{6}O_{10}	benzenepentacarboxylic acid	1585-40-6
C_{11}H_{8}CrO_{4}	acetophenonechromium tricarbonyl	12153-11-6
C_{11}H_{8}N_{2}	perimidine	204-02-4
C_{11}H_{8}N_{2}O	fuberidazole	3878-19-1
C_{11}H_{8}O_{2}	menadione	58-27-5
C_{11}H_{8}O_{2}	naphthoic acid	1320-04-3
C_{11}H_{9}Cl_{4}NO_{2}	cloponone	15301-50-5
C_{11}H_{9}N_{1}O_{4}	naftazone	15687-37-3
C_{11}H_{10}	methylnaphthalene	1321-94-4
C_{11}H_{10}FeO_{2}	ferrocene carboxylic acid	1271-42-7
C_{11}H_{10}N_{2}	benzyl pyrazine	28217-95-0
C_{11}H_{10}N_{2}O	furaldehyde phenylhydrazone	2216-75-3
C_{11}H_{10}O_{2}	ethylphenylpropiolate	2216-94-6
C_{11}H_{10}O_{2}	indenone ethylene ketal	6710-43-6
C_{11}H_{11}Cl_{2}N_{3}O	muzolimine	55294-15-0
C_{11}H_{11}NO_{2}	desmethylmethsuximide	1497-17-2
C_{11}H_{11}NO_{2}	phensuximide	86-34-0
C_{11}H_{11}N_{3}O_{2}S	sulfapyridine	144-83-2
C_{11}H_{12}ClNO_{3}S	chlormezanone	80-77-3
C_{11}H_{12}Cl_{2}N_{2}O_{5}	chloramphenicol	56-75-7
C_{11}H_{12}Cl_{4}N_{2}O_{3}	monuron tca	140-41-0
C_{11}H_{12}F_{3}N_{3}O_{4}	nitrofor	5254-27-3
C_{11}H_{12}NO_{4}PS_{2}	phosmet	732-11-6
C_{11}H_{12}NO_{5}P	dimethyl phthalimidomethylphosphonate	28447-26-9
C_{11}H_{12}N_{2}O	antipyrine	60-80-0
C_{11}H_{12}N_{2}O_{2}	ethotoin	86-35-1
C_{11}H_{12}N_{2}O_{2}	thozalinone	655-05-0
C_{11}H_{12}N_{2}O_{2}	tryptophan	54-12-6
C_{11}H_{12}N_{2}O_{4}	benzoylglycylglycine	1145-32-0
C_{11}H_{12}N_{2}S	levamisole	6649-23-6
C_{11}H_{12}N_{4}O_{2}	panidazole	13752-33-5
C_{11}H_{12}N_{4}O_{2}S	sulfamerazine	127-79-7
C_{11}H_{12}N_{4}O_{3}S	sulfameter	651-06-9
C_{11}H_{12}O	cyclobutyl phenyl ketone	5407-98-7
C_{11}H_{12}O_{2}	benzyl methacrylate	2495-37-6
C_{11}H_{12}O_{3}	allyl phenoxyacetate	7493-74-5
C_{11}H_{12}O_{3}	ethyl benzoylacetate	94-02-0
C_{11}H_{12}O_{3}	helional	1205-17-0
C_{11}H_{12}O_{3}	myristicin	607-91-0
C_{11}H_{12}O_{4}	benzal diacetate	581-55-5
C_{11}H_{13}ClF_{3}N_{3}O_{4}S_{3}	polythiazide	346-18-9
C_{11}H_{13}ClO_{3}	mecoprop methyl ester	23844-56-6
C_{11}H_{13}Cl_{2}N_{3}O_{4}	chlornidine	26389-78-6
C_{11}H_{13}F_{3}N_{4}O_{4}	dinitramine	29091-05-2
C_{11}H_{13}NO_{2}	fenmetramide	5588-29-4
C_{11}H_{13}NO_{3}	hydrastinine	6592-85-4
C_{11}H_{13}NO_{4}	bendiocarb	22781-23-3
C_{11}H_{13}NO_{4}	carbobenzyloxyglycine methyl ester	1212-53-9
C_{11}H_{13}N_{3}O	aminoantipyrene	83-07-8
C_{11}H_{13}N_{3}O_{3}S	sulfamoxole	729-99-7
C_{11}H_{14}	trimethylstyrene	769-57-3
C_{11}H_{14}	[[D_{3}-trishomocubane]]	99380-61-7
C_{11}H_{14}N_{2}O	cytisine	485-35-8
C_{11}H_{14}N_{2}O_{2}	pheneturide	90-49-3
C_{11}H_{14}N_{2}O_{4}	felbamate	25451-15-4
C_{11}H_{14}O_{2}	isopropyl phenylacetate	4861-85-2
C_{11}H_{14}O_{2}	mesitylacetic acid	4408-60-0
C_{11}H_{14}O_{3}	anisyl propionate	7549-33-9
C_{11}H_{14}O_{4}	diethylene glycol monobenzoate	20587-61-5
C_{11}H_{15}BrN_{2}O_{3}	narcobarbital	125-55-3
C_{11}H_{15}Cl	chloropentamethylbenzene	5153-39-9
C_{11}H_{15}Cl_{2}N_{5}	chlorproguanil	537-21-3
C_{11}H_{15}Cl_{2}O_{3}PS_{2}	chlorthiophos	51052-59-6
C_{11}H_{15}N	aletamine	4255-23-6
C_{11}H_{15}NO	isovaleranilide	2364-50-3
C_{11}H_{15}NO	phenmetrazine	134-49-6
C_{11}H_{15}NO_{2}	butamben	94-25-7
C_{11}H_{15}NO_{2}	pentamethylnitrobenzene	13171-59-0
C_{11}H_{15}NO_{2}	phenylcarbamic acid butyl ester	1538-74-5
C_{11}H_{15}NO_{2}	methylenedioxymethamphetamine	
C_{11}H_{15}NO_{2}S	ethiofencarb	56729-20-5
C_{11}H_{15}NO_{3}	hydroxyphenamate	50-19-1
C_{11}H_{15}NO_{4}S	mesurol sulfone	2179-25-1
C_{11}H_{15}NO_{5}	methocarbamol	532-03-6
C_{11}H_{15}N_{3}O_{2}	formetanate	22259-30-9
C_{11}H_{16}BrNO_{2}	brolamfetamine	64638-07-9
C_{11}H_{16}ClNO	chlorprenaline	3811-25-4
C_{11}H_{16}ClO_{2}PS_{3}	carbofenotion	786-19-6
C_{11}H_{16}ClO_{3}PS_{2}	carbophenoxon	7173-84-4
C_{11}H_{16}N_{2}O_{2}	aminocarb	2032-59-9
C_{11}H_{16}N_{2}O_{3}	talbutal	115-44-6
C_{11}H_{16}N_{2}O_{3}	vinbarbital	125-42-8
C_{11}H_{16}N_{2}O_{3}	vinylbital	2430-49-1
C_{11}H_{16}O	benzenepentanol	10521-91-2
C_{11}H_{16}O	carvacrol me ether	6379-73-3
C_{11}H_{16}O	fenipentol	583-03-9
C_{11}H_{16}O_{2}	benzaldehyde diethylacetal	774-48-1
C_{11}H_{16}O_{2}	dihydroactinidiolide	17092-92-1
C_{11}H_{16}O_{3}	diethyl phenyl orthoformate	14444-77-0
C_{11}H_{16}O_{4}	diacetoxynorbornane	17290-00-5
C_{11}H_{16}O_{4}	dimethyl diallylmalonate	35357-77-8
C_{11}H_{16}Si	vinyldimethylbenzylsilane	18001-46-2
C_{11}H_{17}F_{5}O_{2}	octyl pentafluoropropionate	1867-95-4
C_{11}H_{17}N	benzenepentanamine	17734-21-3
C_{11}H_{17}N	ethylamphetamine	457-87-4
C_{11}H_{17}N	pentorex	434-43-5
C_{11}H_{17}NO	methoxyphenamine	93-30-1
C_{11}H_{17}NO	methylephedrine	552-79-4
C_{11}H_{17}NO	mexiletine	31828-71-4
C_{11}H_{17}NO_{3}	isoprenaline	7683-59-2
C_{11}H_{17}O_{3}PS	diethyl phenylthiomethylphosphonate	38066-16-9
C_{11}H_{17}O_{3}PS	ibp	13286-32-3
C_{11}H_{17}O_{4}PS_{2}	fensulfothion	115-90-2
C_{11}H_{18}	cycloundecyne	702-32-9
C_{11}H_{18}	homoadamantane	281-46-9
C_{11}H_{18}N_{2}O	tetrahydrocytisine	18161-94-9
C_{11}H_{18}N_{2}O_{3}	pentobarbital	76-74-4
C_{11}H_{18}N_{2}O_{3}S	fast red pdc salt	80-22-8
C_{11}H_{18}N_{2}O_{4}	hydroxypentobarbital	4241-40-1
C_{11}H_{18}N_{4}O_{2}	pirimicarb	23103-98-2
C_{11}H_{18}O	adamantylmethylether	19066-23-0
C_{11}H_{18}O	dihydrojasmone	1128-08-1
C_{11}H_{18}O	dimethylvinylethynylmethanol butyl ether	819-41-0
C_{11}H_{18}O_{2}	bornyl formate	7492-41-3
C_{11}H_{18}O_{2}	ethyl octyne carbonate	10031-92-2
C_{11}H_{18}O_{2}	geranyl formate	105-86-2
C_{11}H_{18}O_{2}	isobornyl formate	1200-67-5
C_{11}H_{18}O_{2}	methyl geranate	2349-14-6
C_{11}H_{18}O_{3}	pinonic acid methyl ester	16978-11-3
C_{11}H_{18}O_{4}	pinic acid dimethyl ester	473-73-4
C_{11}H_{19}Cl_{3}O_{2}	nonyl trichloroacetate	65611-32-7
C_{11}H_{19}N_{3}O	ethirimol	23947-60-6
C_{11}H_{20}	cyclopentylcyclohexane	1606-08-2
C_{11}H_{20}	dicyclopentylmethane	2619-34-3
C_{11}H_{20}	methylenecyclodecane	3817-57-0
C_{11}H_{20}	neopentylidenecyclohexane	39546-80-0
C_{11}H_{20}Cl_{2}O_{2}	nonyl dichloroacetate	83004-99-3
C_{11}H_{20}N_{2}O_{6}	saccharopine	997-68-2
C_{11}H_{20}N_{3}O_{3}PS	pirimiphos methyl	29232-93-7
C_{11}H_{20}N_{4}O_{3}S	epronaz	59026-08-3
C_{11}H_{20}O	cycloundecanone	878-13-7
C_{11}H_{20}O	undecenal	1337-83-3
C_{11}H_{20}OSi	triallylethoxysilane	17962-20-8
C_{11}H_{20}O_{2}	hexyl tiglate	16930-96-4
C_{11}H_{20}O_{2}	undecanolactone	710-04-3
C_{11}H_{20}O_{2}	undecylenic acid	112-38-9
C_{11}H_{20}O_{4}	diethyl butylmalonate	133-08-4
C_{11}H_{20}O_{4}	diethyl diethylmalonate	77-25-8
C_{11}H_{20}O_{4}	diethyl pimelate	2050-20-6
C_{11}H_{20}O_{4}	sebacic acid monomethyl ester	818-88-2
C_{11}H_{20}O_{4}	tetraethoxyallene	85152-89-2
C_{11}H_{20}O_{4}	undecanedioic acid	1852-04-6
C_{11}H_{20}O_{10}	Sambubiose	26388-68-1
C_{11}H_{21}ClO_{2}	nonyl chloroacetate	5451-96-7
C_{11}H_{21}N	undecanenitrile	2244-07-7
C_{11}H_{21}NOS	cycloate	1134-23-2
C_{11}H_{21}NS	decyl isothiocyanate	24540-94-1
C_{11}H_{21}N_{5}OS	methoprotryne	841-06-5
C_{11}H_{21}N_{5}S	dimethametryn	22936-75-0
C_{11}H_{21}O_{2}Tl	thallium undecanoate	34244-93-4
C_{11}H_{22}	cycloundecane	294-41-7
C_{11}H_{22}	methylcyclodecane	13151-43-4
C_{11}H_{22}	undecene	28761-27-5
C_{11}H_{22}O	undecanal	112-44-7
C_{11}H_{22}O	undecanone	53452-70-3
C_{11}H_{22}O_{2}	isobutyl heptanoate	7779-80-8
C_{11}H_{22}O_{2}	propyl octanoate	624-13-5
C_{11}H_{22}O_{2}	undecanoic acid	112-37-8
C_{11}H_{22}O_{2}SSn	dibutyltin mercaptopropionate	78-06-8
C_{11}H_{22}O_{3}	octyl lactate	51191-33-4
C_{11}H_{23}NOS	butylate	2008-41-5
C_{11}H_{23}NO_{2}	piperidinoacetal	3616-58-8
C_{11}H_{24}	undecane	1120-21-4
C_{11}H_{24}O	isopropyl octyl ether	68975-45-1
C_{11}H_{24}O_{4}S	undecyl sulfuric acid	4297-99-8
C_{11}H_{24}S	decyl methyl sulfide	22438-39-7
C_{11}H_{25}N	diethylheptylamine	26981-81-7
C_{11}H_{25}N	methyldecylamine	7516-82-7
C_{11}H_{26}OSi	pentyloxytriethylsilane	14629-52-8
C_{11}H_{26}N_{4}O	1,3-bis(3-(dimethylamino)propyl)urea	52338-87-1
C_{11}H_{27}NO_{6}P_{2}	tetraethyl dimethylaminomethylenediphosphonate	18855-52-2

== See also ==
- Carbon number
- List of compounds with carbon number 10
- List of compounds with carbon number 12
