= C12H18N2O3 =

Molecular formula

The molecular formula C_{12}H_{18}N_{2}O_{3} (molar mass: 238.28 g/mol) may refer to:

- McN-481
- Nealbarbital
- Secobarbital
- Spirobarbital
