= C12H13ClN2O =

The molecular formula C_{12}H_{13}ClN_{2}O may refer to:

- BK-5Cl-NM-AMT
- Buturon
