= Monoterpenol O-acetyltransferase =

Identifiers
- EC no.: 2.3.1.69
- CAS no.: 78990-59-7

Databases
- IntEnz: IntEnz view
- BRENDA: BRENDA entry
- ExPASy: NiceZyme view
- KEGG: KEGG entry
- MetaCyc: metabolic pathway
- PRIAM: profile
- PDB structures: RCSB PDB PDBe PDBsum
- Gene Ontology: AmiGO / QuickGO
Search
- PMC: articles
- PubMed: articles
- NCBI: proteins

Monoterpenol O-acetyltransferase (EC 2.3.1.69) is an enzyme that catalyzes the general chemical reaction

a monoterpenol +acetyl-CoA $\rightleftharpoons$ a monoterpenol acetate ester + CoA

Menthol is a typical substrate of the enzyme characterised from peppermint and is converted to menthyl acetate:

menthol
+
acetyl-CoA
menthyl acetate
+ coenzyme A

This enzyme belongs to the family of transferases, specifically those acyltransferases transferring groups other than aminoacyl groups. The systematic name of this enzyme class is acetyl-CoA:monoterpenol O-acetyltransferase. This enzyme is also called menthol transacetylase.
