= Smart glass =

Glass with electrically switchable opacity

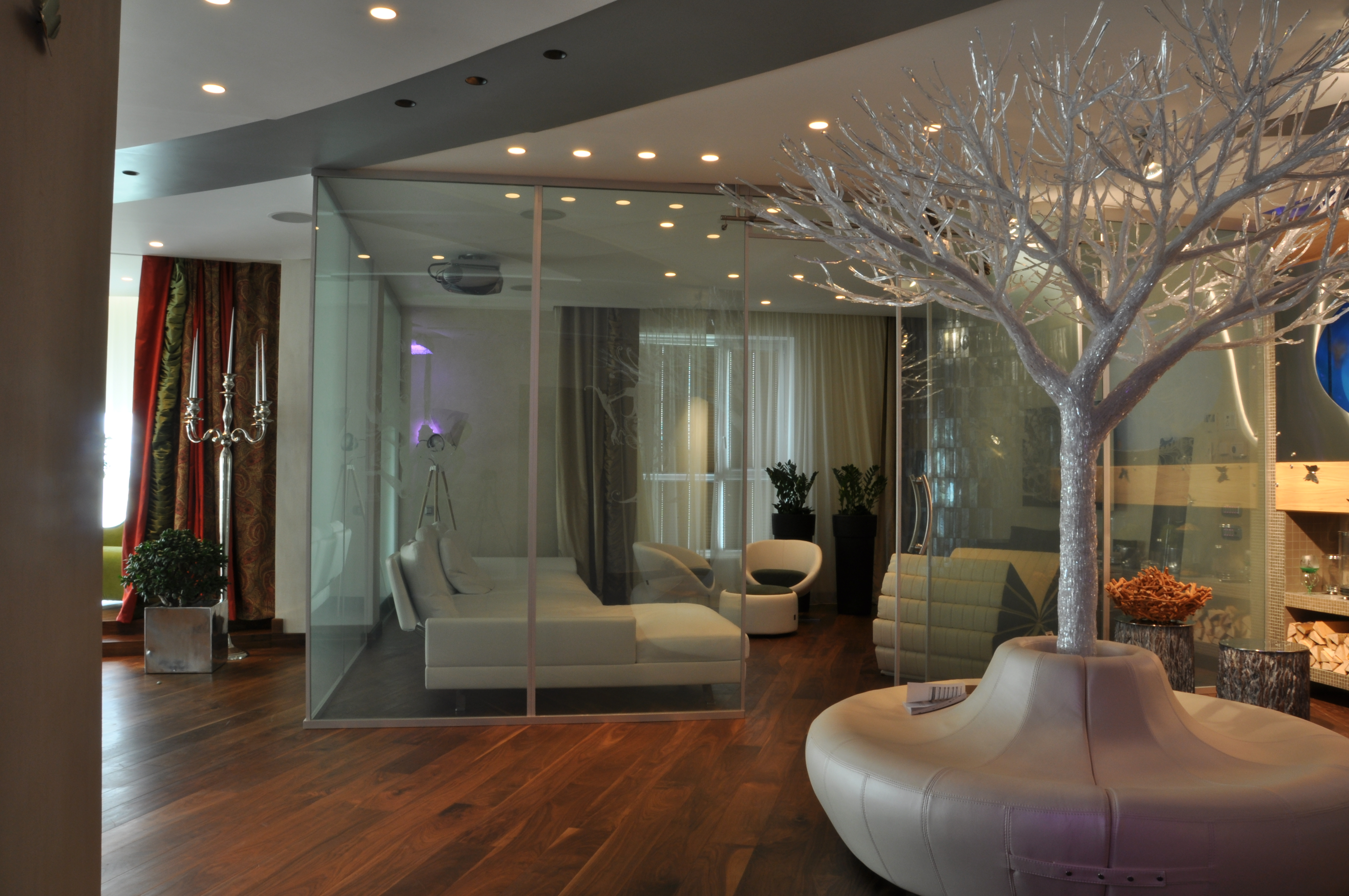
Smart glass in a transparent state

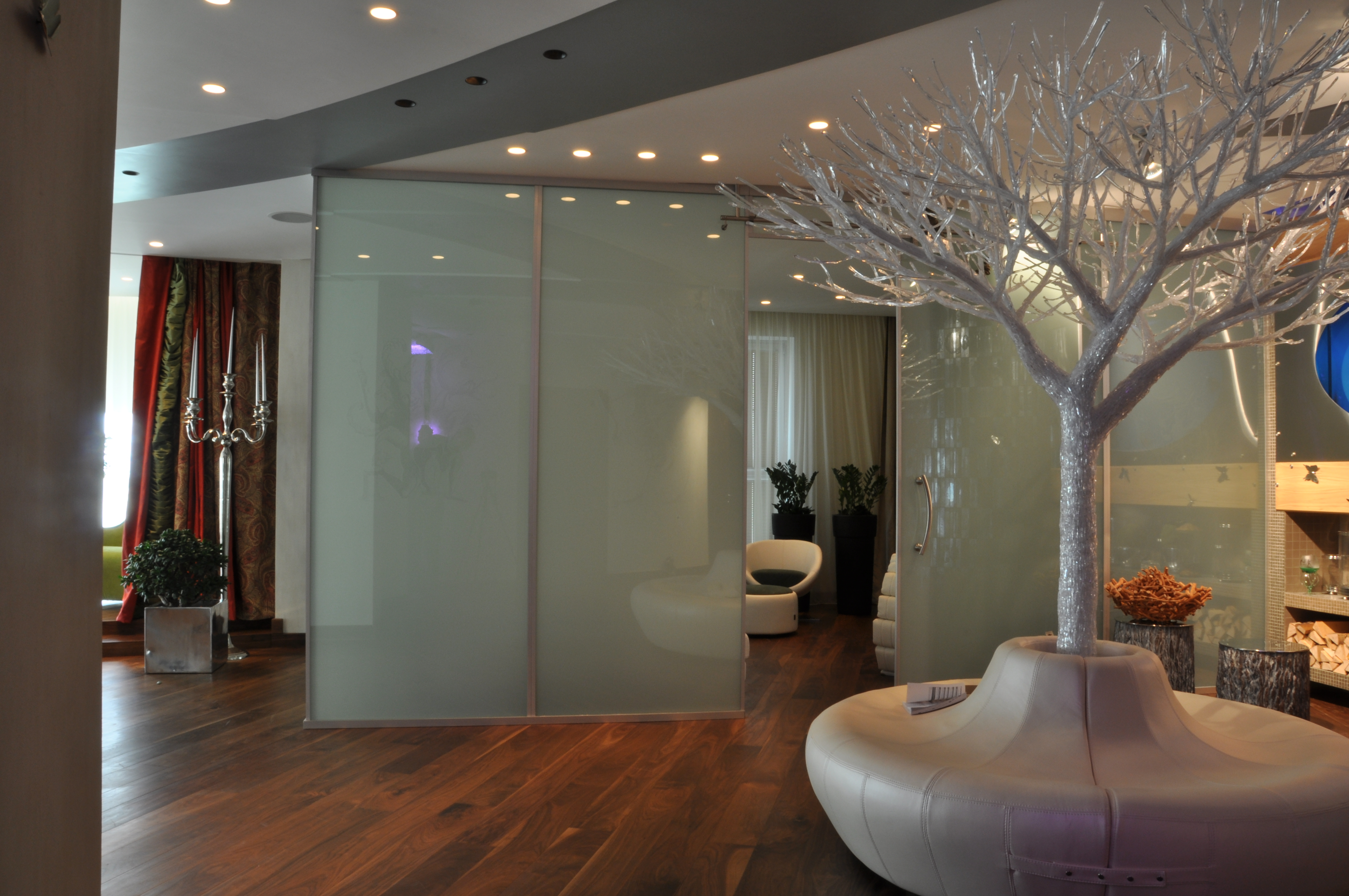
Smart glass in an opaque state

Effect of thermochromic, photochromic, and electrochromic glazing on glass

Smart glass, also known as switchable glass, dynamic glass, and smart-tinting glass, is a type of glass that can change its optical properties, becoming opaque or tinted, in response to electrical or thermal signals. This can be used to prevent sunlight and heat from entering a building during hot days, improving energy efficiency. It can also be used to conveniently provide privacy or visibility to a room.

There are two primary classifications of smart glass: active or passive. The most common active glass technologies used today are electrochromic, liquid crystal, and suspended particle devices (SPD). Thermochromic and photochromic are classified as passive technologies.

When installed in the envelope of buildings, smart glass helps to create climate adaptive building shells, which benefits include things such as natural light adjustment, visual comfort, UV and infrared blocking, reduced energy use, thermal comfort, resistance to extreme weather conditions, and privacy. Some smart windows can self-adapt to heat or cool for energy conservation in buildings. Smart windows can eliminate the need for blinds, shades or window treatments.

Some effects can be obtained by laminating smart film or switchable film onto flat surfaces using glass, acrylic or polycarbonate laminates. Some types of smart films can be applied to existing glass windows using either a self-adhesive smart film or special glue. Spray-on methods for applying clear coatings to block heat and conduct electricity are also under development.

== History ==
In 1987, Nippon Sheet Glass (NSG) launched UMU, the first switchable light control glass. It introduced the ability to switch between transparent and opaque by turning the voltage on or off.

The term "smart window" originated in the 1980s. It was introduced by Swedish material physicist Claes-Göran Granqvist from Chalmers University of Technology, who was brainstorming ideas for making building materials more energy efficient with scientists from Lawrence Berkeley National Laboratory in California. Granqvist used the term to describe a responsive window capable of dynamically changing its tint.

== Electrically switchable smart glass ==
The following table shows an overview of the different electrically switchable smart glass technologies:

Technology	State with electricity	State without electricity	Comment
Electrochromic devices	Electric pulses are used for changing the light transmission	Maintains previous state	Transition times and light transmissivity vary by manufacturer.
Polymer-dispersed liquid-crystal devices	Transparent	Opaque	Clear or opaque states only. Primarily used for privacy control for interior settings.
Suspended-particle devices	Transparent	Partly opaque	Enables control of light transmissivity.
Micro-blinds	Opaque	Transparent	Switches state quickly, handles wear from UV radiation well

=== Electrochromic devices ===
Electrochromic devices change light transmission properties in response to voltage and thus allow control over the amount of light and heat passing through. In electrochromic windows, the material changes its opacity. A burst of electricity is required for changing its opacity, but the material maintains its shade with little to no additional electrical signals.

Old electrochromic technologies tend to have a yellow cast in their clear states and blue hues in their tinted states. Darkening occurs from the edges, moving inward, and is a slow process, ranging from many seconds to 20–30 minutes depending on window size. Newer electrochromic technologies eliminate the yellow cast in the clear state and tinting to more neutral shades of gray, tinting evenly rather than from the outside in, and accelerate the tinting speeds to less than three minutes, regardless of the size of the glass. Electrochromic glass maintains visibility in its darkened state and thus preserves visual contact with the outside environment.

Recent advances in electrochromic materials pertaining to transition-metal hydride electrochromics have led to the development of reflective hydrides, which become reflective rather than absorbing, and thus switch states between transparent and mirror-like.

Recent advancements in modified porous nanocrystalline films have enabled the creation of electrochromic display. The single substrate display structure consists of several stacked porous layers printed on top of each other on a substrate modified with a transparent conductor (such as ITO or PEDOT:PSS). Each printed layer has a specific set of functions. A working electrode consists of a positive porous semiconductor such as titanium dioxide, with adsorbed chromogens. These chromogens change color via reduction or oxidation. A passivator is used as the negative of the image to improve electrical performance. The insulator layer serves the purpose of increasing the contrast ratio and electrically separating the working electrode from the counter electrode. The counter electrode provides a high capacitance to counterbalance the charges inserted/extracted on the SEG electrode (and maintain charge neutrality in the overall device). Carbon is an example of a charge reservoir film. A conducting carbon layer is typically used as the conductive back contact for the counter electrode. In the last printing step, the porous monolith structure is overprinted with a liquid or polymer-gel electrolyte, dried, and then may be incorporated into various encapsulation or enclosures, depending on the application requirements. Displays are very thin, often 30 micrometers. The device can be switched on by applying an electrical potential to the transparent conducting substrate relative to the conductive carbon layer. This causes a reduction of viologen molecules (coloration) to occur inside the working electrode. By reversing the applied potential or providing a discharge path, the device bleaches. A unique feature of the electrochromic monolith is the relatively low voltage (around 1 Volt) needed to color or bleach the viologens. This can be explained by the small over- potentials needed to drive the electrochemical reduction of the surface adsorbed viologens/chromogens.

Most types of smart film require voltage (e.g. 110VAC) to operate, and therefore such types of smart films must be enclosed within glass, acrylic or polycarbonate laminates to provide electrical safety to users.

=== Polymer-dispersed liquid-crystal devices ===
In polymer-dispersed liquid-crystal devices (PDLCs), liquid crystals are dissolved or dispersed into a liquid polymer followed by solidification or curing of the polymer. During the change of the polymer from a liquid to solid, the liquid crystals become incompatible with the solid polymer and form droplets throughout the solid polymer. The curing conditions affect the size of the droplets that in turn affect the final operating properties of the "smart window". Typically, the liquid mix of polymer and liquid crystals is placed between two layers of glass or plastic that include a thin layer of a transparent, conductive material followed by curing of the polymer, thereby forming the basic sandwich structure of the smart window. This structure is in effect a capacitor.

Electrodes from a power supply are attached to the transparent electrodes. With no applied voltage, the liquid crystals are randomly arranged in the droplets, resulting in scattering of light as it passes through the smart window assembly. This results in the translucent, "milky white" appearance. When a voltage is applied to the electrodes, the electric field formed between the two transparent electrodes on the glass causes the liquid crystals to align, allowing light to pass through the droplets with very little scattering and resulting in a transparent state. The degree of transparency can be controlled by the applied voltage. This is possible because at lower voltages, only a few of the liquid crystals align completely in the electric field, so only a small portion of the light passes through while most of the light is scattered. As the voltage is increased, fewer liquid crystals remain out of alignment, resulting in less light being scattered. It is also possible to control the amount of light and heat passing through, when tints and special inner layers are used.

=== Suspended-particle devices ===
In suspended-particle devices (SPDs), a thin film laminate of rod-like nano-scale particles is suspended in a liquid and placed between two pieces of glass or plastic, or attached to one layer. When no voltage is applied, the suspended particles are randomly organized, thus blocking and absorbing light. When voltage is applied, the suspended particles align and let light pass. Varying the voltage of the film varies the orientation of the suspended particles, thereby regulating the tint of the glazing and the amount of light transmitted. SPDs can be manually or automatically "tuned" to precisely control the amount of light, glare and heat passing through.

=== Micro-blinds ===
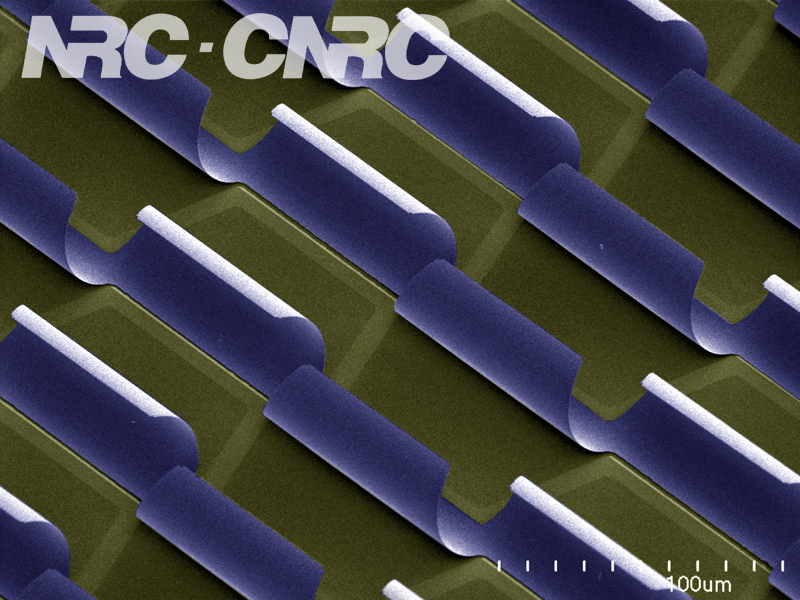
Scanning electron microscope (SEM) image of micro-blinds

Micro-blinds control the amount of light passing through in response to applied voltage. The micro-blinds are composed of rolled thin metal blinds on glass. They are very small and thus practically invisible to the eye. The metal layer is deposited by magnetron sputtering and patterned by laser or lithography process. The glass substrate includes a thin layer of a transparent conducting oxide (TCO). A thin insulator is deposited between the rolled metal layer and the TCO layer for electrical disconnection. With no applied voltage, the micro-blinds are rolled and let light pass through. When there is a potential difference between the rolled metal layer and the transparent conductive layer, the electric field formed between the two electrodes causes the rolled micro-blinds to stretch out and thus block light. The micro-blinds have several advantages including switching speed (milliseconds), UV durability, customized appearance and transmission. The technology of micro-blinds was developed at the National Research Council Canada.

== Thermochromic smart glass ==
=== Phase-changing polymer (PCP) ===
Phase-changing polymer (PCP) shows reversible phase transition between amorphous and semicrystalline states. This change of phase is dominated by temperature change in thermochromic smart glass application, making it completely automatic at no electricity cost. The structure of PCP often consists of two major components: a phase-changing component polymer (let's call it P1) crosslinked with another polymer (P2) which is strongly phase-separated from the former due to different hydrophilicity. Therefore, P1 and P2 are able to form micron-level phase separation after curing. When the temperature is below the phase-transition temperature (Tp) of P1, P1 is semi-crystalline and its refractive index matches with that of P2, thus making the whole structure transparent to visible light. When the temperature goes above Tp, P1 melts and transitions into amorphous phase which exhibits a large refractive index mismatch with P2, resulting in an opaque appearance. By smartly selecting the material for P1, a reversed effect of transmittance switch can be observed. For example, if at below Tp the refractive index of the semi-crystalline P1 dismatches that of P2, the film then is opaque; if the amorphous P1 matches P2 with respect to refractive index at above Tp, then the film is transparent at the elevated temperature. One signature application would be that, PCP be coated on the glass window of a warehouse where PCP becomes opaque during hot days to block excessive radiation and cools the room down, thus saving energy from running an air conditioner.

== Related areas of technology ==
The expression smart glass can be interpreted in a wider sense to include also glazings that change light transmission properties in response to an environmental signal such as light or temperature.

- Different types of glazing can show a variety of chromic phenomena, that is, based on photochemical effects the glazing changes its light transmission properties in response to an environmental signal such as light (photochromism), temperature (thermochromism), or voltage (electrochromism).
- Liquid crystals, when they are in a thermotropic state, can change light transmission properties in response to temperature. However, high temperatures are required to change the properties of liquid crystals and thermotropic liquid crystal compounds can be difficult to synthesize without blocking some wavelengths of the visible colour spectrum.
- Various metals have been investigated. Thin Mg-Ni films have low visible transmittance and are reflective. When they are exposed to H_{2} gas or reduced by an alkaline electrolyte, they become transparent. This transition is attributed to the formation of magnesium nickel hydride, Mg_{2}NiH_{4}. Films were created by co sputtering from separate targets of Ni and Mg to facilitate variations in composition. Single-target d.c. magnetron sputtering could be used eventually which would be relatively simple compared to deposition of electrochromic oxides, making them more affordable. The Lawrence Berkeley National Laboratory determined that new transition metals were cheaper and less reactive, but contained the same qualities, thus further reducing the cost.
- Tungsten-doped vanadium dioxide (VO_{2}) coating reflects infrared light when the temperature rises over 29 °C (84 °F), to block out sunlight transmission through windows at high ambient temperatures. Vanadium dioxide undergoes a semiconductor-to-metal transition at a relatively low temperature. This transition changes the material from have conducting properties to insulating properties and ends up changing the color of the glass as well as its transmission properties. Once the coating undergoes this change, it can effectively keep what it is insulating from gaining heat through filtering out the infrared spectrum.

These types of glazings cannot be controlled manually. In contrast, all electrically switched smart windows can be made to automatically adapt their light transmission properties in response to temperature or brightness by integration with a thermometer or photosensor, respectively.

== Applications ==
=== Electric curtain ===
Smart glass can be used for energy-saving heating and cooling in building by controlling the amount of sunlight which passes through a window. A transparent or haze temperature control film makes the smart film enter a haze state when it is sunny and the indoor temperature is high. When it's sunny and the indoor temperature is low, the smart glass enters a transparent state.

=== Privacy ===
In the office:

- Applied to the glass enclosure of a conference room. When the glass is transparent, one can see into or out of the room, and when it is non-transparent it can be used as a projection screen.
- Energy-saving function of glass curtain wall

Indoor decoration of residence:

- Lighting cover glass curtain, sunshine house, living room and bathroom compartment. The glass is in a cloudy state when out of use, which protects privacy, and when it turns to transparent, it can allow sunlight.

=== Advertising ===
Product display and commercial advertisement:

- Glass display window, protect the products when it is non-transparent, and may be used for projection to introduce products; when it is transparent, it may be used for store advertising.

Smart glass can be used as a switchable projection screen on a store window for advertising. Third generation smart film is good for both front and rear projection, and projected images can be viewed from both sides.

=== Other uses ===
Uses for other special occasions include:

- The glass door of a restroom is transparent when not in use, and immediately turn cloudy when the door is closed.
- Glass floor and stairs on the second floor appear cloudy when walked upon, otherwise they are transparent.
- Privacy uses in hospitals, e.g., windows of infants' room and intensive care units, replacing curtains, to reduce dust and noise.
- Applied to dust-free rooms and cleaning rooms, smart films may be used to switch between transparent and non-transparent, and can reduce inconvenience for customers having to wear dust-free clothes passing in and out of the room.

== Examples of use ==
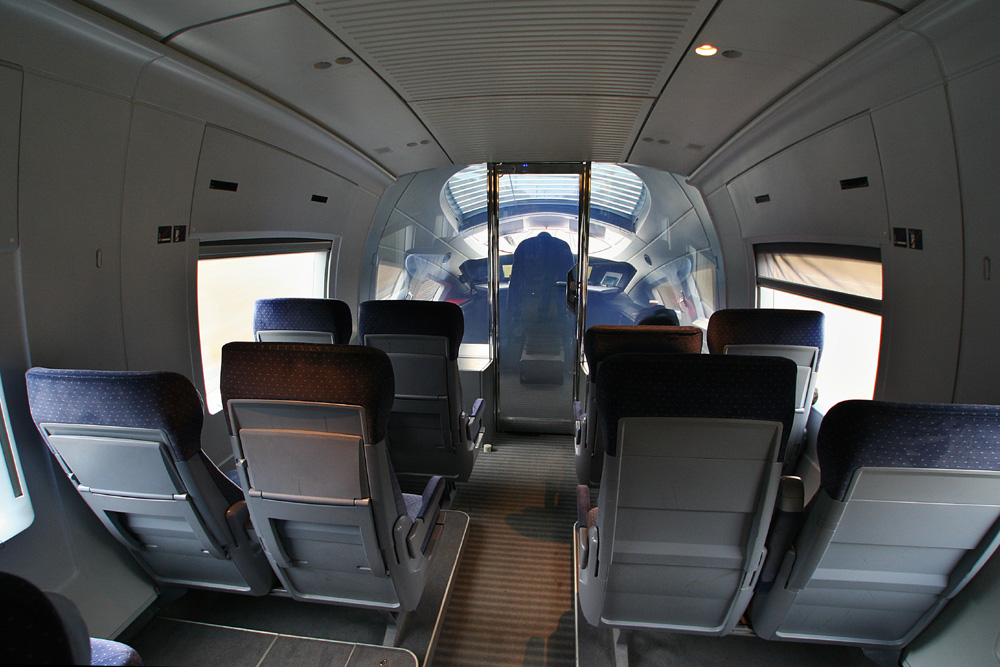
ICE 3 train with view into driver's cab

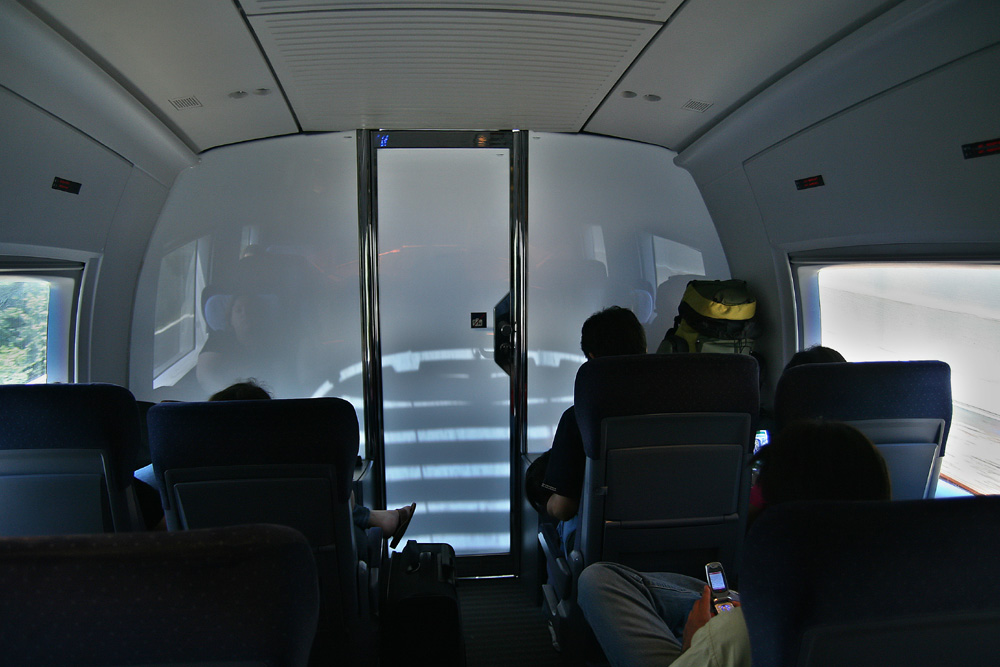
ICE 3 train with glass panel switched to "frosted" mode

Eureka Tower in Melbourne has a glass cube which projects 3 m (10 ft) out from the building with visitors inside, suspended almost 300 m (984 ft) above the ground. When one enters, the glass is opaque as the cube moves out over the edge of the building. Once fully extended over the edge, the glass becomes clear.

The Boeing 787 aircraft features electrochromic windows which replaced the pull-down window shades on existing aircraft.

NASA has looked into using electrochromics to manage the thermal environment experienced by the Orion and Altair space vehicles.

Smart glass has been used in some small-production cars including the Ferrari 575 M Superamerica.

ICE 3 high speed trains use electrochromic glass panels between the passenger compartment and the driver's cabin.

The elevators in the Washington Monument use smart glass in order for passengers to view the commemorative stones inside the monument.

The city's restroom in the Museumplein square in Amsterdam features smart glass for ease of determining the occupancy status of an empty stall when the door is shut, and then for privacy when occupied.

Bombardier Transportation is planning to offer windows using smart glass technology in its Flexity 2 light rail vehicles.

Chinese phone manufacturer OnePlus demonstrated a phone whose rear cameras are placed behind a pane of electrochromic glass.

Public toilets in Tokyo use this technology to address safety and privacy concerns. People approaching a restroom are able to confirm that it is empty because they can see through into the interior while the door is unlocked. Once the occupied restroom door is locked, walls of the room are opaque.

The Volkswagen ID.7 has a smart glass panoramic sunroof, which can be switched from transparent to opaque electrically.

The University of Toronto has utilized Smart Film Technology on a curtain wall to provide privacy in their swimming pool viewing area.

== See also ==
- Anti-flash white
- Flash blindness
- Heatable glass
- Smart film
- LED film
