= Dilauroyl peroxide =

Names
- Other names lauroyl peroxide, LP

Identifiers
CAS Number	105-74-8
3D model (JSmol)	Interactive image
ChEBI	CHEBI:82479
ChemSpider	7485
ECHA InfoCard	100.003.025
EC Number	203-326-3
KEGG	7773
PubChem CID	7773
RTECS number	OF2625000
UNII	83TLB4N1D5
UN number	3106
CompTox Dashboard (EPA)	DTXSID1059319
- InChI: InChI=1S/C24H46O4/c1-3-5-7-9-11-13-15-17-19-21-23(25)27-28-24(26)22-20-18-16-14-12-10-8-6-4-2/h3-22H2,1-2H3 Key: YIVJZNGAASQVEM-UHFFFAOYSA-N
- SMILES: CCCCCCCCCCCC(=O)OOC(=O)CCCCCCCCCCC

Properties
Chemical formula	C_{24}H_{46}O_{4}
Molar mass	398.628 g·mol^{−1}
Appearance	white solid
Melting point	54 °C (129 °F; 327 K)

Hazards
- GHS labelling
Pictograms	(GHS02: Flammable)
Signal word	Warning
Hazard statements	H242
Precautionary statements	P210, P234, P240, P280, P370+P378, P403, P410, P411, P420, P501
- Except where otherwise noted, data are given for materials in their standard state (at 25 °C [77 °F], 100 kPa). Infobox references

Dilauroyl peroxide is an organic compound with the formula (C_{11}H_{23}CO_{2})_{2}. A colorless solid, it is often sold as a water-damped solid. It is the symmetrical peroxide of lauric acid. It is produced by treating lauroyl chloride with hydrogen peroxide in the presence of base:

2 C_{11}H_{23}COCl + H_{2}O_{2} + 2 NaOH → (C_{11}H_{23}CO_{2})_{2} + 2 NaCl
