= Electrochromism =

Electrochemical phenomenon

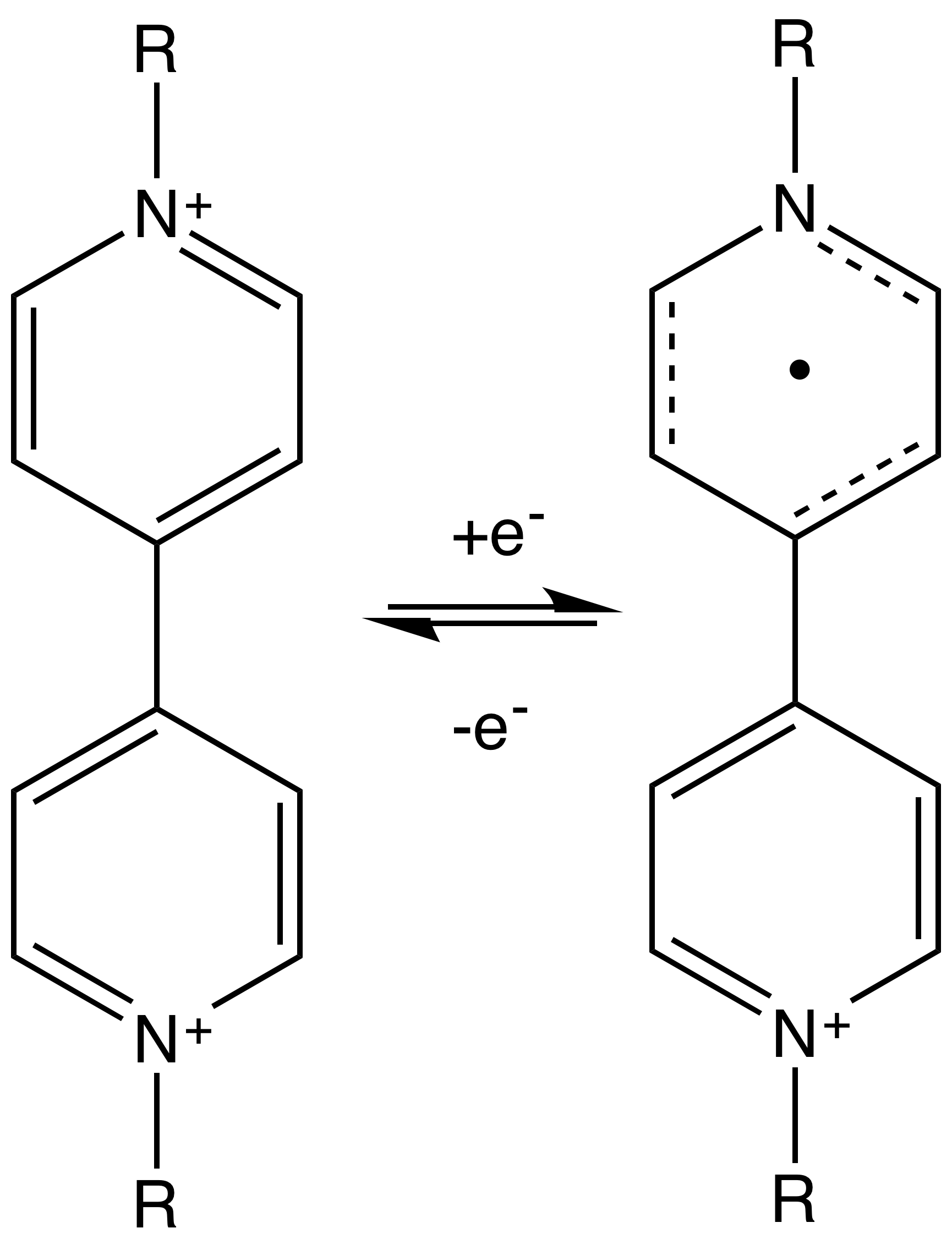
Redox couple for a viologen. The 2+ species on the left is colorless, and the 1+ species on the right is deep blue or red, depending on the identity of R.

Electrochromism is a phenomenon in which a material displays changes in color or opacity in response to an electrical stimulus. In this way, a smart window made of an electrochromic material can block specific wavelengths of ultraviolet, visible or (near) infrared light. The ability to control the transmittance of near-infrared light can increase the energy efficiency of a building, reducing the amount of energy needed to cool during summer and heat during winter.

As the color change is persistent and energy needs only to be applied to effect a change, electrochromic materials are used to control the amount of light and heat allowed to pass through a surface, most commonly "smart windows". One popular application is in the automobile industry where it is used to automatically tint rear-view mirrors in various lighting conditions.

== Principle ==
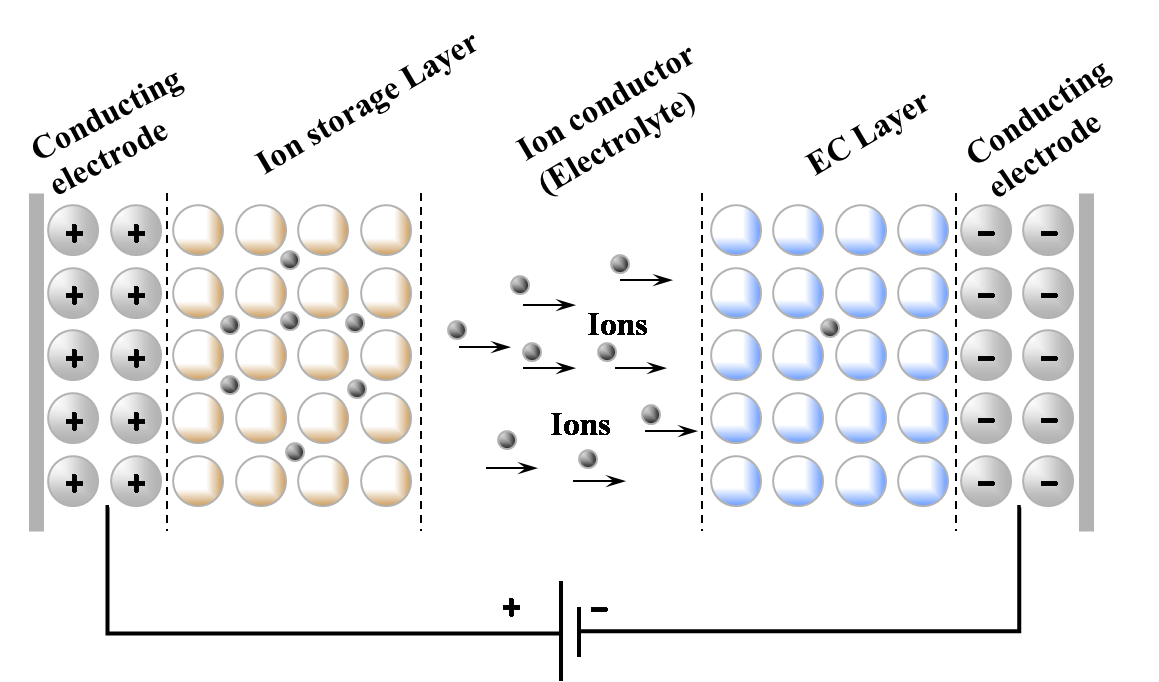
Cross-section of an electrochromic panel changing from transparent to opaque. A voltage is applied across the conducting electrodes, and ions flow from the ion storage layer, through the electrolyte, and into the electrochromic layer.

The phenomenon of electrochromism occurs in some transition metal oxides which conduct both electrons and ions, such as tungsten trioxide (WO_{3}). These oxides have octahedral structures of oxygen which surround a central metal atom and are joined together at the corners. This arrangement produces a three-dimensional nanoporous structure with "tunnels" between individual octahedral segments. These tunnels allow dissociated ions to pass through the substance when they are motivated by an electric field. Common ions used for this purpose are H^{+} and Li^{+}.

The electric field is typically induced by two flat, transparent electrodes which sandwich the ion-containing layers. As a voltage is applied across these electrodes, the difference in charge between the two sides causes the ions to penetrate the oxide as the charge-balancing electrons flow between the electrodes. These electrons change the valency of the metal atoms in the oxide, reducing their charge, as in the following example of tungsten trioxide:

WO_{3} + n(H^{+} + e^{−}) → H_{n}WO_{3}

This is a redox reaction since the electroactive metal accepts electrons from the electrodes, forming a half-cell. Strictly speaking, the electrode as a chemical unit comprises the flat plate as well as the semiconducting substance in contact with it. However, the term "electrode" often refers to only the flat plate(s), more specifically called the electrode "substrate".

Photons that reach the oxide layer can cause an electron to move between two nearby metal ions. The energy provided by the photon causes the movement of an electron which in turn causes optical absorption of the photon. For example, the following process occurs in tungsten oxide for two tungsten ions a and b:

W^{5+}_{a} + W^{6+}_{b} + photon → W^{6+}_{a} + W^{5+}_{b}

== Electrochromic materials ==
Electrochromic materials, also known as chromophores, affect the optical color or opacity of a surface when a voltage is applied. Among the metal oxides, tungsten oxide (WO_{3}) is the most extensively studied and well-known electrochromic material. Others include molybdenum, titanium and niobium oxides, although these are less effective optically.

Viologens are a class of organic materials that are being intensively investigated for electrochromic applications. These 4,4′-bipyridine compounds display reversible color changes between a colorless and a deep-blue color due to redox reactions. Researchers can "tune" them to a deep blue or intense green.

As organic materials, viologens are seen as promising alternatives for electronic applications, compared to metal-based systems, which tend to be expensive, toxic, and a problem to recycle. Possible advantages of viologens include their optical contrast, coloration efficiency, redox stability, ease of design, and potential to scale up for large-area preparation.

Viologens have been used with phenylenediamine by Gentex Corporation, which has commercialized auto-dimming rearview mirrors and smart windows in Boeing 787 aircraft. Viologen has been used in conjunction with titanium dioxide (TiO_{2}, also known as titania) in the creation of small digital displays. A variety of conducting polymers are also of interest for displays, including polypyrrole, PEDOT, and polyaniline.

=== Synthesis of tungsten oxide ===
Many methods have been used to synthesize tungsten oxide, including chemical vapor deposition (CVD), sputtering, thermal evaporation, spray pyrolysis (from a vapor or sol-gel), and hydrothermal synthesis (from a liquid). In industry, sputtering is the most common method for the deposition of tungsten oxide. For material synthesis, sol-gel process is widely used due to its advantages of simple process, low cost, and easy control.

==== Sol-gel process ====
In the sol-gel process of tungsten trioxide, WCl_{6} is dissolved in alcohol and then oxidized by purging O_{2} into its solution:

2WCl_{6} + 3O_{2} → 3WO_{3} + 6Cl_{2}

The formation of H_{2} is performed by the reaction of alcohol and chlorine that used for the reduction of WO_{3} to obtain a blue solution of HWO_{3}:

(CH_{3})_{2}CH–OH + 3Cl_{2} → (Cl_{3}C)_{2}=O + 4H_{2}

2WO_{3} + H_{2} → 2HWO_{3}

WO_{3} nanoparticles can also be obtained by precipitation of ammonium tungstate para pentahydrate, (NH_{4})_{10}W_{12}O_{41}⋅5H_{2}O, or nitric acid, HNO_{3}, under acidic conditions from aqueous solutions.

== Working principle of electrochromic windows ==
Multiple layers are needed for a functional smart window with electrochromic characteristics. The first and last are transparent glass made of silica (SiO_{2}), the two electrodes are needed to apply the voltage, which in turn will push (or pull) Li^{+} ions from the ion storage layer, through the electrolyte into the electrochromic material (or vice versa). Applying a high voltage (4 V or more) will push lithium-ions into the electrochromic layer, deactivating the electrochromic material. The window is fully transparent now. By applying a lower voltage (2.5 V for example) the concentration of Li-ions in the electrochromic layer decreases, thus activating (N)IR-active tungsten oxide. This activation causes reflection of infrared light, thus lowering the greenhouse effect, which in turn reduces the amount of energy needed for air conditioning. Depending on the electrochromic material used, different parts of the spectrum can be blocked, this way UV, visible and IR light can be independently reflected at the will of a user.

== Applications ==
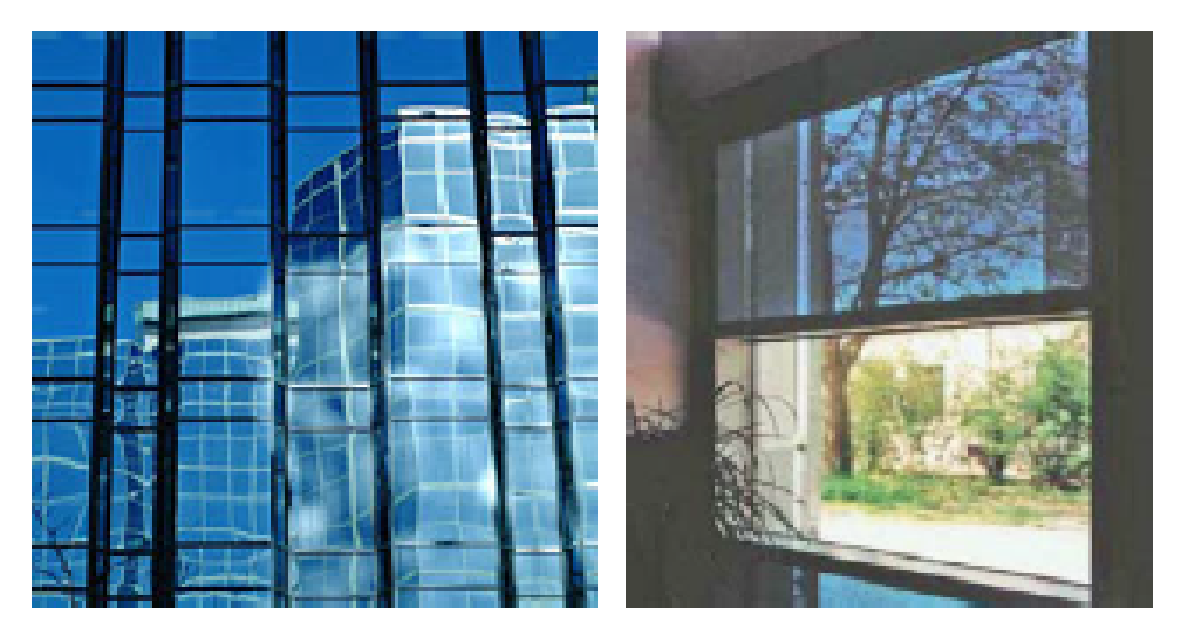
Electrochromic glass installed in buildings

Several electrochromic devices have been developed. Electrochromism is commonly used in the production of electrochromic windows or "smart glass", and more recently electrochromic displays on paper substrate as anti-counterfeiting systems integrated into packaging. NiO materials have been widely studied as counter electrodes for complementary electrochromic devices, particularly for smart windows.

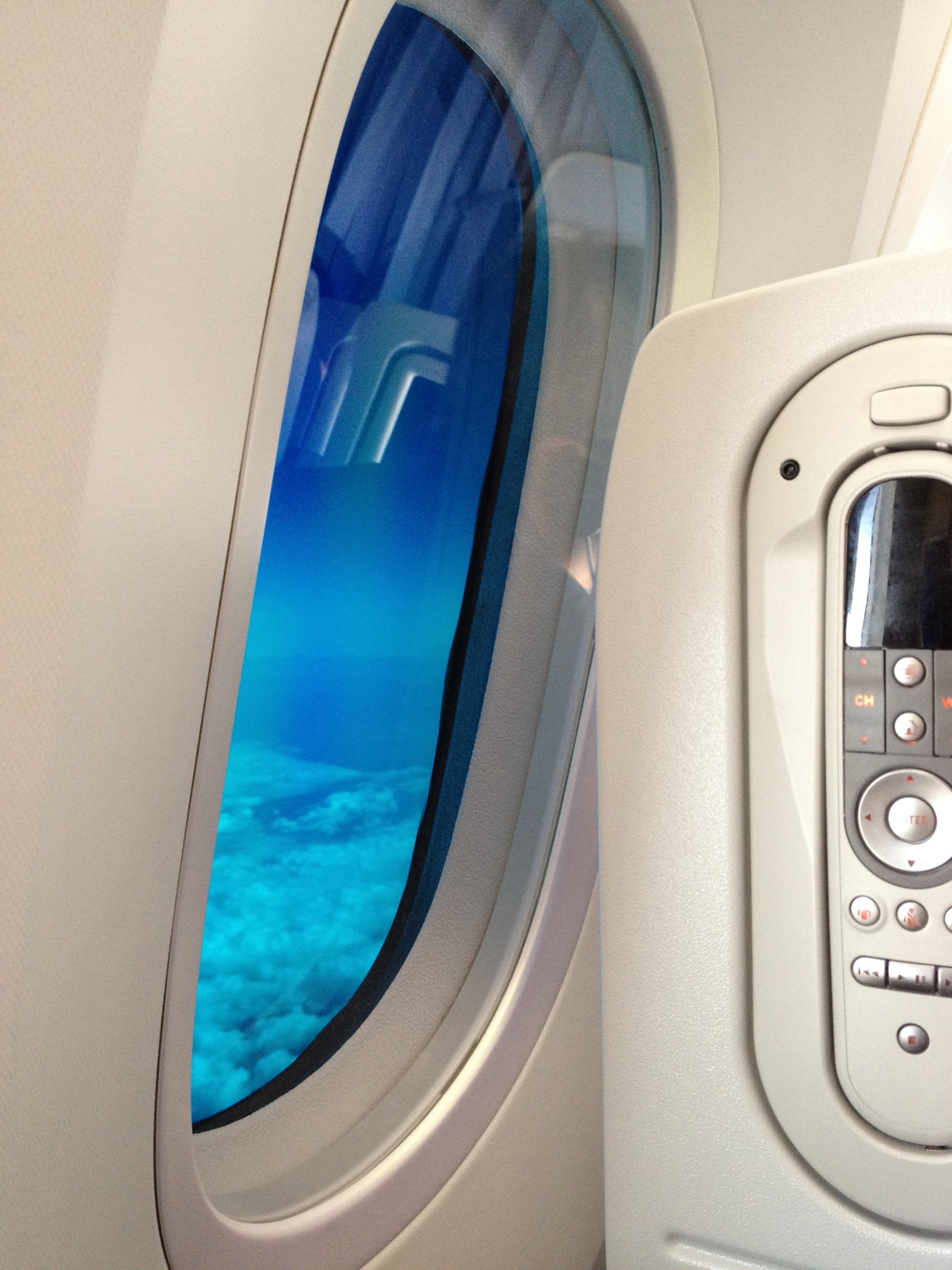
Electrochromatic window on an ANA Boeing 787-8 Dreamliner passenger jet

ICE 3 high speed trains use electrochromic glass panels between the passenger compartment and the driver's cabin. The standard mode is clear, and can be switched by the driver to frosted. Electrochromic windows are used in the Boeing 787 Dreamliner in the form of a dimmable panel between the exterior window and interior dust cover, allowing crew and passengers to control the transparency of the windows.

== See also ==
- Electrochromic devices
- Electronic paper
- Phosphaphenalene
- Smart glass
