= Electrochromic device =

Controls optical properties on application of voltage

An electrochromic device (ECD) controls optical properties such as optical transmission, absorption, reflectance and/or emittance in a continual but reversible manner on application of voltage (electrochromism). This property enables an ECD to be used for applications like smart glass, electrochromic mirrors, and electrochromic display devices.

== History ==
The history of electro-coloration goes back to 1704 when Johann Jacob Diesbach discovered Prussian blue (hexacyanoferrate), which changes color from transparent to blue under oxidation of iron. In the 1930s, Kobosew and Nekrassow first noted electrochemical coloration in bulk tungsten oxide. While working at Balzers in Lichtenstein, T. Kraus provided a detailed description of the electrochemical coloration in a thin film of tungsten trioxide (WO_{3}) on 30 July 1953. In 1969, S. K. Deb demonstrated electrochromic coloration in WO_{3} thin films. Deb observed electrochromic color by applying an electric field on the order of 10^{4} Vcm^{−1} across WO_{3} thin film. In fact, the real birth of the EC technology is usually attributed to S. K. Deb’s seminal paper of 1973, wherein he described the coloration mechanism in WO_{3}. The electrochromism occurs due to the electrochemical redox reactions that take place in electrochromic materials. Various types of materials and structures can be used to construct electrochromic devices, depending on the specific applications.

== Device structure ==
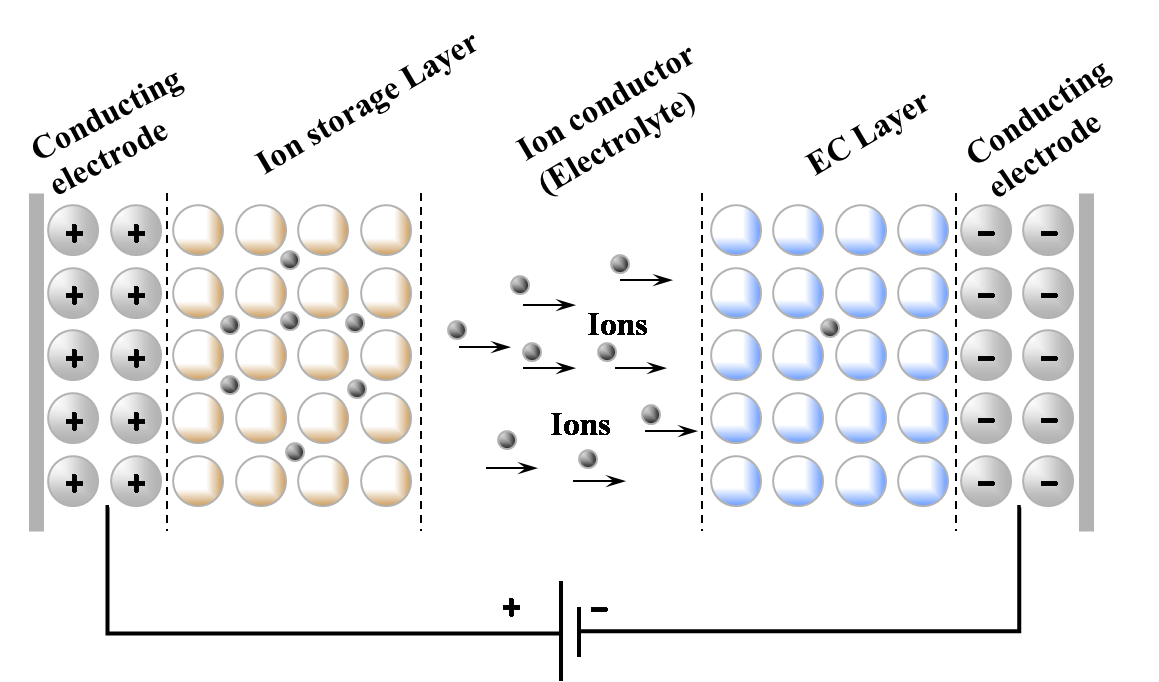
Cross-sectional diagram showing the layers of a typical laminated electrochromic device

Electrochromic (sometimes called electrochromatic) devices are one kind of electrochromic cells. The basic structure of ECD consists of two EC layers separated by an electrolytic layer. The ECD works on an external voltage, for which the conducting electrodes are used on the either side of both EC layers. Electrochromic devices can be categorized in two types depending upon the kind of electrolyte used viz. Laminated ECD are the one in which liquid gel is used while in solid electrolyte EC devices solid inorganic or organic material is used. The basic structure of electrochromic device embodies five superimposed layers on one substrate or positioned between two substrates in a laminated configuration. In this structure there are three principally different kinds of layered materials in the ECD: The EC layer and ion-storage layer conduct ions and electrons and belong to the class of mixed conductors. The electrolyte is a pure ion conductor and separates the two EC layers. The transparent conductors are pure electron conductors. Optical absorption occurs when electrons move into the EC layers from the transparent conductors along with charge balancing ions entering from the electrolyte.

=== Solid-state devices ===
In solid-state electrochromic devices, a solid inorganic or organic material is used as the electrolyte. Ta_{2}O_{5} and ZrO_{2} are the most extensively studied inorganic solid electrolytes.

=== Laminated devices ===
Laminated electrochromic devices contain a liquid gel which is used as the electrolyte.

== Mode of operation ==
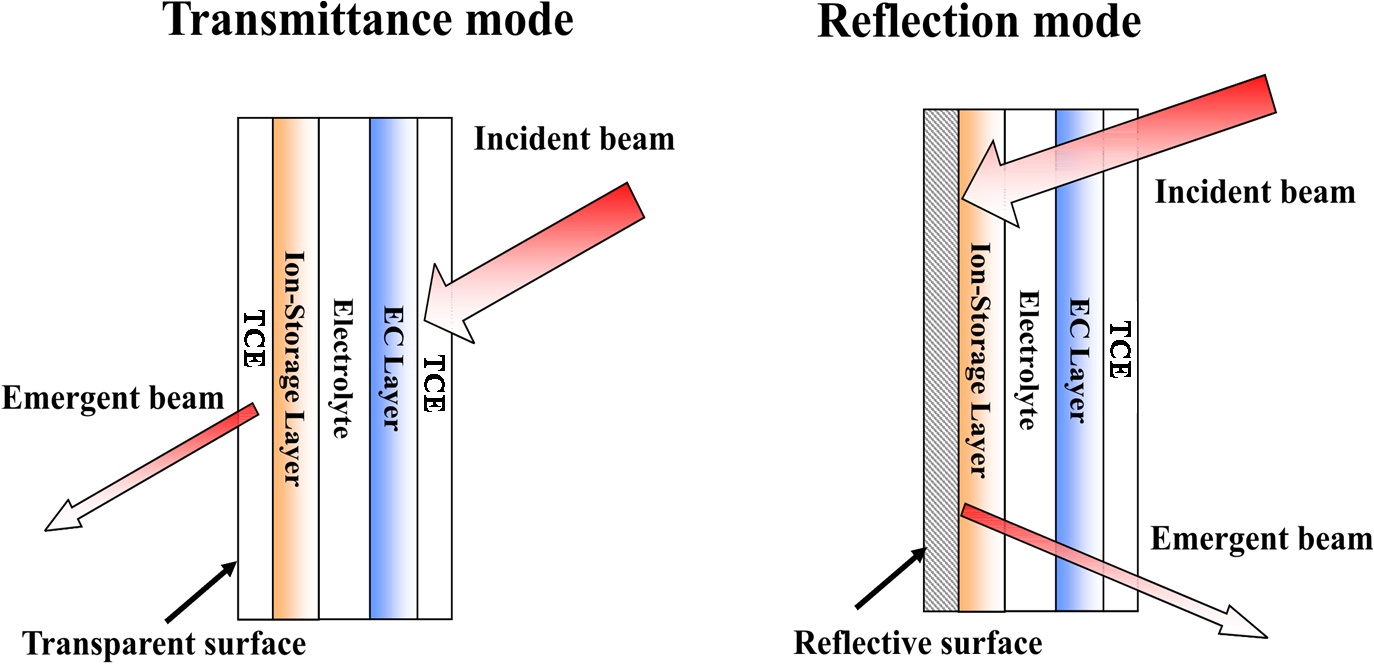
Modes of electrochromic device operation

Typically, ECD are of two types depending on the modes of device operation, namely the transmission mode and reflectance mode. In the transmission mode, the conducting electrodes are transparent and control the light intensity passing through them; this mode is used in smart-window applications. In the reflectance mode, one of the transparent conducting electrodes (TCE) is replaced with a reflective surface like aluminum, gold or silver, which controls the reflective light intensity; this mode is useful in rear-view mirrors of cars and EC display devices.

== Applications ==
=== Smart windows ===
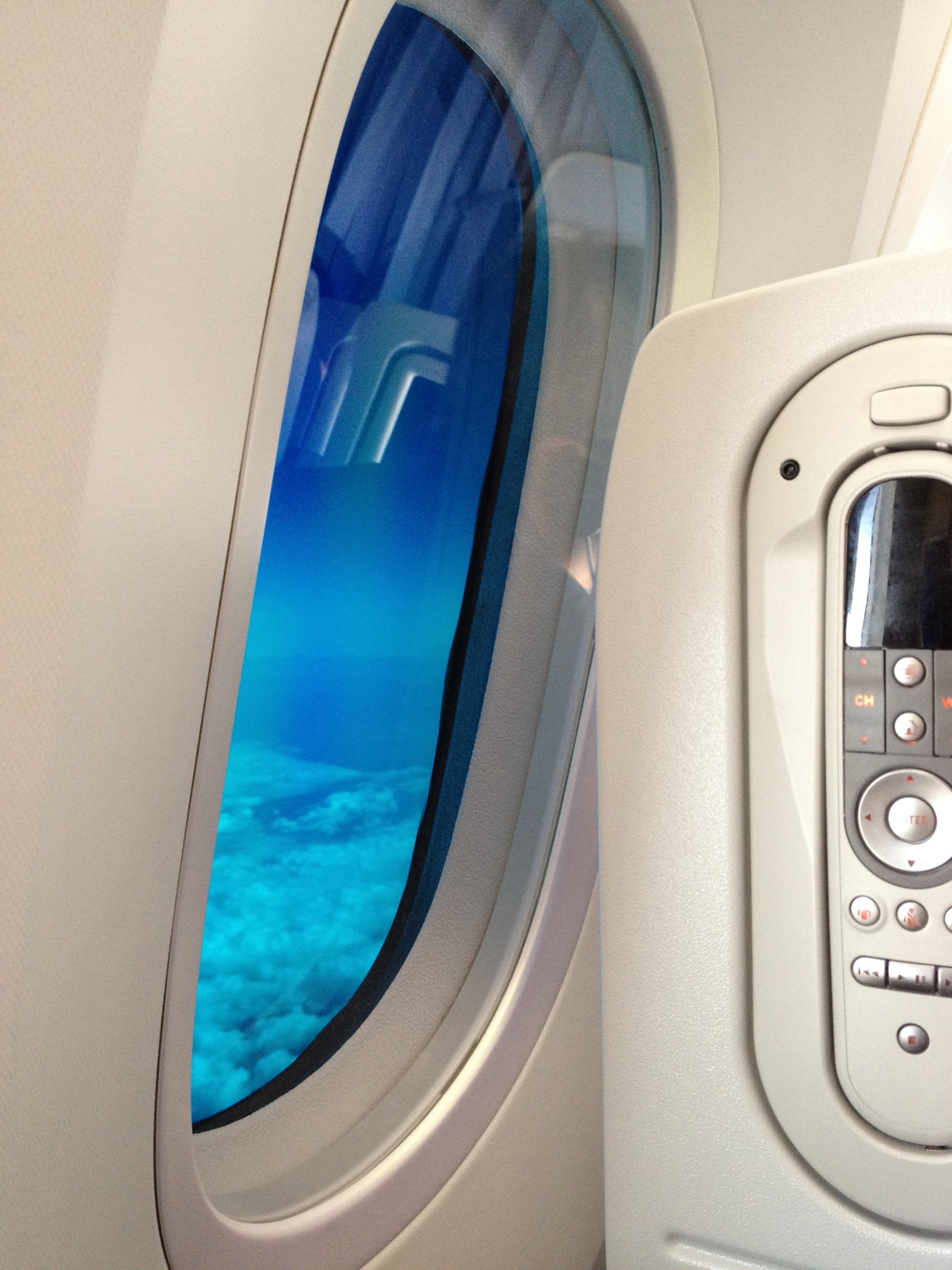
Electrochromatic window on an ANA Boeing 787-8 Dreamliner passenger jet

Windows have both direct and indirect impacts on building energy consumption. Electrochromic windows, or the application of electrochromic switchable glazes deposited on to windows, also known as smart windows, are a technology for energy efficiency used in buildings by controlling the amount of sunlight passing through. The solar-optical properties of electrochromic coatings vary over a wide range in response to an applied electrical signal that can be applied via execution of laboratory processes, such as Cyclic Voltammetry (CV). Specifically, these smart windows are made of Tungsten Oxide (WO_{3}). Tungsten Oxide is known to be a standard material used for electrochromic devices because of its wide optical window, ranging from 400-630 nm, and prolonged cyclic stability on the order of thousands of cycles. To enhance the electrochromic performance of Tungsten Oxide coatings, electro chromic coatings are prepared by introducing a small amount of dopamine (DA) into a peroxo tungstic acid (PTA) precursor sol to form tungsten complexes on the surface of nanoparticles. This processing method shows promising cyclic stability as it will last up to thirty five thousand cycles which is greater than that of regular WO_{3} since new ligand formation promotes plasmonic tuning in nanoparticle electrochemistry. They can also produce less glare than fritted glass. The efficiency of electrochromic windows is dependent on the intrinsic properties of the coating, the placement of the coating within a window system, and parameters related to the building they are used for. In addition to this, electrochromic coating efficiency is directly dependent on the growth kinetics of such thin-film layers since thinner films, and non-even coatings, have a lower optical signal compared to the thicker films with more uniformity having more control and experience a greater optical signal.

These windows usually contain layers for tinting in response to increases in incoming sunlight and to protect from UV radiation. For example the glass developed by Gesimat, has a tungsten oxide layer, a polyvinyl butyral layer and a Prussian Blue layer sandwiched by two dual layers of glass and fluorine-doped glass coated with tin oxide. The tungsten oxide and Prussian Blue layers form the positive and negative ends of a battery using the incoming light energy. The polyvinyl butyral (PVB) forms the central layer and serves as a polymer electrolyte. This allows for the flow of ions which, in turn, generates a current.

=== Mirrors ===
Electrochromic mirrors use a combination of optoelectronic sensors and complex electronics that monitor both ambient light and the intensity of the light shining on the surface. As soon as glare makes contact with the surface, these mirrors automatically dim reflections of flashing light from following vehicles at night so that a driver can see them without discomfort. These mirrors, however, only dim relative to the amount of light that shines on them.

=== Other displays ===
Electrochromic displays can operate in one of two modes: reflecting light mode, where light or other radiation strikes a surface and is redirected, or transmitting light mode, which is transmitted through a substrate; the majority of displays operates in a reflective mode. Even though electrochromic devices are considered to be more “passive” since they do not emit light and need external illumination to function, electrochromic coatings on devices have been proposed for flat panel displays and visual-display units (VDUs). For example, an electrochromic coating was featured on an iPod in the early 2000s, and the Nanochromic screen surpassed that of the original iPod in terms of its fidelity in display quality and screen brightness. Electrochromics have been used for other display applications as well; however, the technology is still somewhat nascent and competes with Liquid-crystal displays (LCDs) and their presence in the market. Electrochromic devices do have advantages over materials synthesized to produce LCD based optoelectronics, such as consuming little to no power in producing images and the same amount of power is needed to keep present displays, and there is no restriction to the size of such a device since it is dependent on manufacturing capability and number of electrodes. But they are not regularly used because of their quick response times, 𝜏, estimated by the equation l=(Dt)0.5. For type I-electrochromics (solution-phase) species, the diffusion coefficient is on the order of 10^{–7} cm^{2}/s. In comparison, for type III-electrochromic species, the diffusion coefficient is on the order of 10^{–12} cm^{2}/s, which allows for a longer response time on the order of ten seconds compared to almost a millisecond when using type I devices. Such electrochromic displays, to be used commercially, need to be optimized at the materials processing and synthesis level to compete with LCDs in advanced display technologies beyond the iPod.

Other applications include dynamically tinting goggles and motorcycle helmet visors, and special paper for drawing on with a stylus.

== Gallery ==
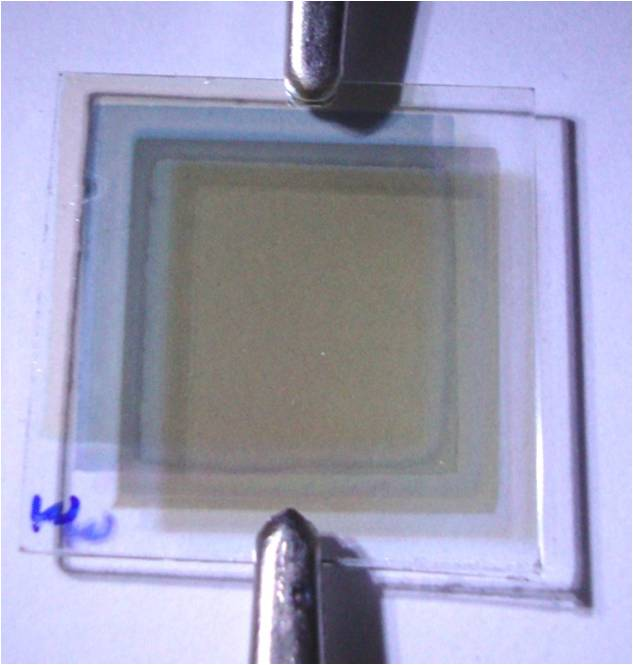
An electrochromic slide in bleached state

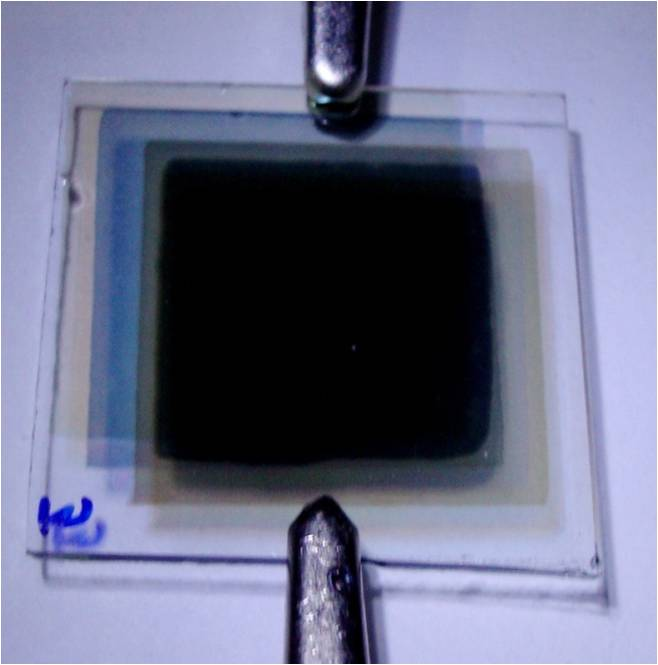
An electrochromic slide in colored state

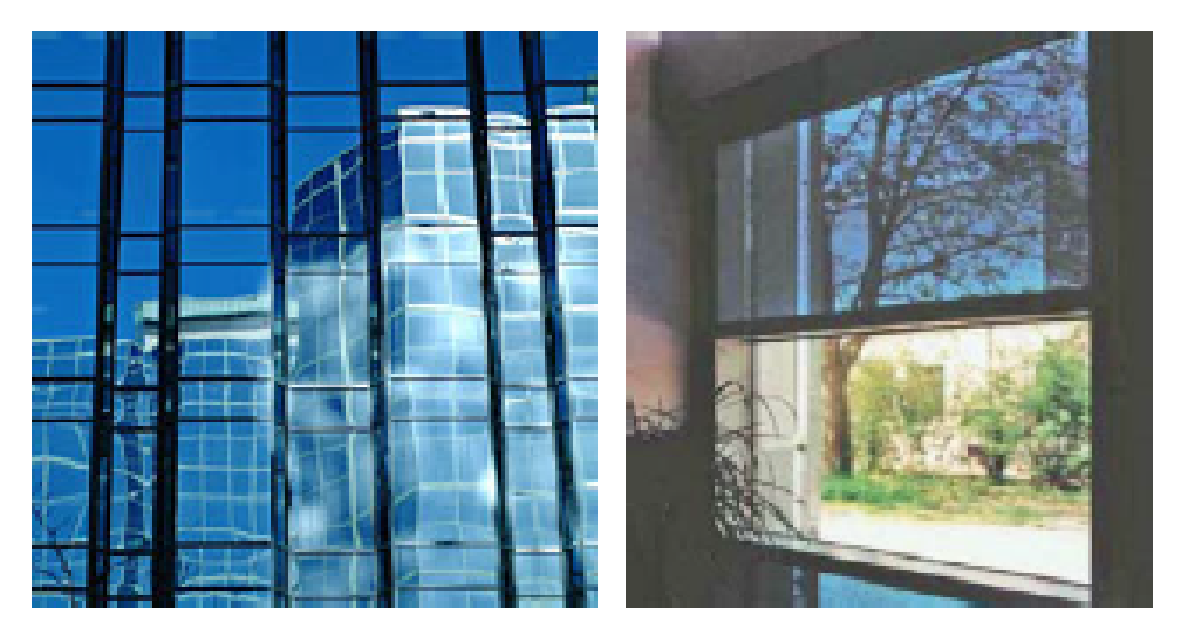
Electrochromic glass installed in buildings

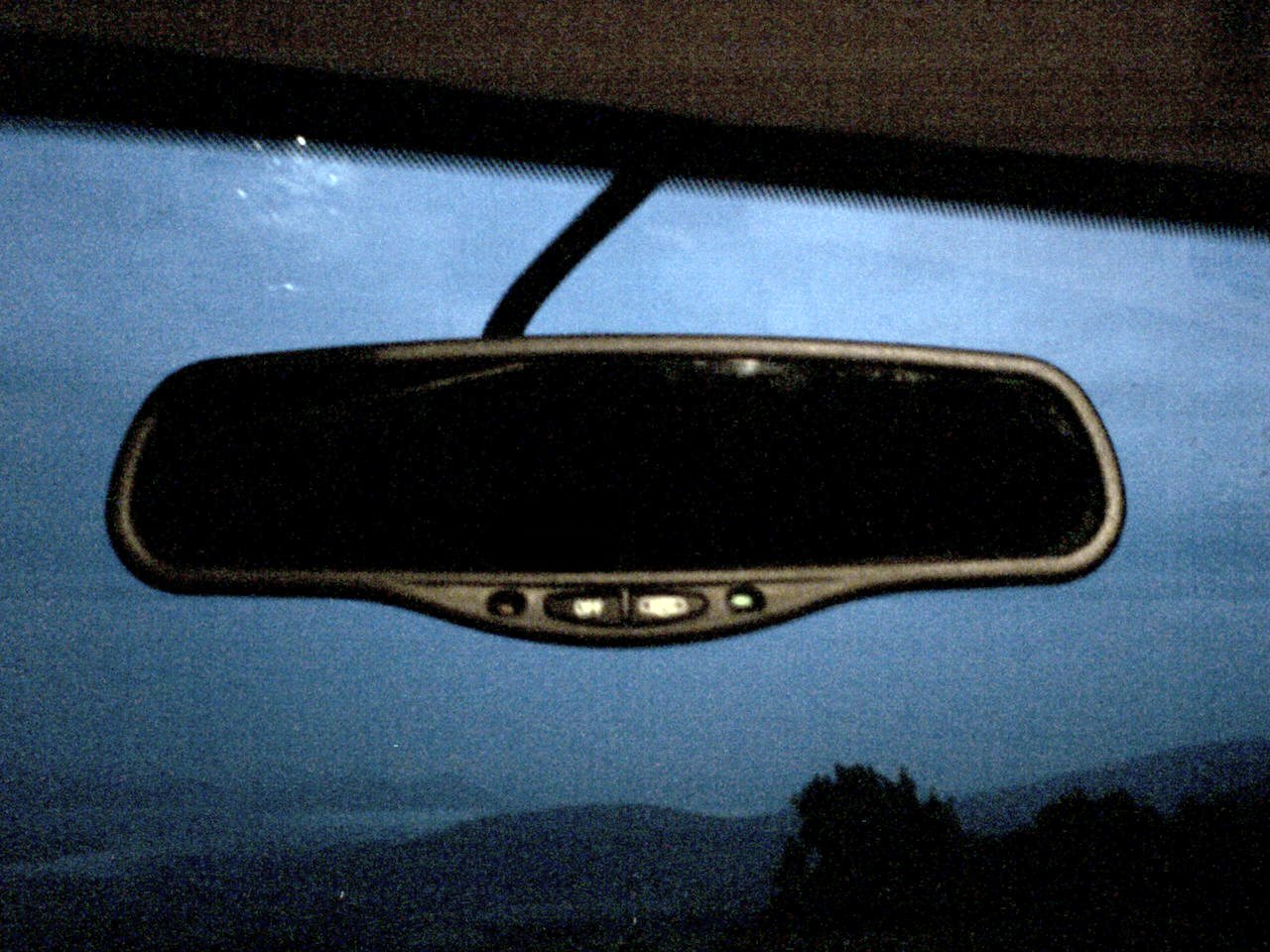
An auto-dimming car mirror
