= C11H20O10 =

The molecular formula C_{11}H_{20}O_{10} (molar mass: 312.27 g/mol, molar mass: 312.1056 u) may refer to:

- Sambubiose, a disaccharide
- Vicianose, a disaccharide
