= Spirobarbital =

Chemical compound

Clinical data
- Other names: 5-spiro-(2'-ethyl-3'-5'-dimethyl-cyclopentyl)barbituric acid
- ATC code: none

Identifiers
- IUPAC name: 1-ethyl-2,4-dimethyl-7,9-diazaspiro[4.5]decane-6,8,10-trione
- CAS Number: 72035-36-0; Sodium salt: 12262-77-0
- UNII: LR477QH2IL; Sodium salt: 4NGD254IO1
- CompTox Dashboard (EPA): DTXSID601027534

Chemical and physical data
- Formula: C_{12}H_{18}N_{2}O_{3}
- Molar mass: 238.287 g·mol^{−1}
- 3D model (JSmol): Interactive image
- SMILES: O=C2NC(=O)NC(=O)C12C(CC)C(C)CC1C

Spirobarbital is a barbiturate derivative developed by Eli Lilly in the 1940s. It has hypnotic and sedative effects, and has a moderate potential for abuse.
