= Crufomate =

Names
- Preferred IUPAC name 4-tert-Butyl-2-chlorophenyl methyl N-methylphosphoramidate

Identifiers
CAS Number	299-86-5
3D model (JSmol)	Interactive image
ChEBI	CHEBI:82111
ChemSpider	8941
ECHA InfoCard	100.005.531
EC Number	206-083-1
KEGG	C18972
PubChem CID	9300
UNII	V82Q65924L
CompTox Dashboard (EPA)	DTXSID1037515
- InChI: InChI=1S/C12H19ClNO3P/c1-12(2,3)9-6-7-11(10(13)8-9)17-18(15,14-4)16-5/h6-8H,1-5H3,(H,14,15) Key: BOFHKBLZOYVHSI-UHFFFAOYSA-N
- SMILES: CC(C)(C)C1=CC(=C(C=C1)OP(=O)(NC)OC)Cl

Properties
Chemical formula	C_{12}H_{19}ClNO_{3}P
Molar mass	291.71 g·mol^{−1}

Hazards
- GHS labelling
Pictograms	(GHS07: Exclamation mark) (GHS09: Environmental hazard)
Signal word	Warning
Hazard statements	H302, H312, H410
Precautionary statements	P264, P270, P273, P280, P301+P312, P302+P352, P312, P322, P330, P363, P391, P501
- Except where otherwise noted, data are given for materials in their standard state (at 25 °C [77 °F], 100 kPa). Infobox references

Crufomate is an insecticide.

Potentially toxic to humans, the National Institute for Occupational Safety and Health has set a time-weighted average exposure limit of 5 milligrams per cubic meter, with a short-term limit of up to 20 milligrams per cubic meter for brief exposures of no longer than 15 minutes.

Routes of exposure to crufomate include inhalation, eye contact, skin absorption, and ingestion. Symptoms include eye irritation, loss of appetite, nausea, diarrhea, abdominal cramps, perspiration, lacrimation, blurred vision, dyspnea, wheezing, and respiratory and skin irritation. First aid measures include artificial respiration to treat inhalation exposures, eye irrigation for eye exposures, and immediate washing with soap for skin exposure. Immediate medical attention should be sought if crufomate is swallowed.
