= Azo violet =

Names
- IUPAC name 4-[(E)-(4-Nitrophenyl)diazenyl]benzene-1,3-diol
- Other names (E)-4-[(4-Nitrophenyl)diazenyl]benzene-1,3-diol; 4-(4-Nitrophenyl)azobenzene-1,3-diol; Magneson I p-Nitrophenylazoresorcinol; 4-Nitrophenylazoresorcinol

Identifiers
CAS Number	74-39-5
3D model (JSmol)	Interactive image; Interactive image
ChEBI	CHEBI:66930
ChEMBL	ChEMBL1604790
ChemSpider	11341372
ECHA InfoCard	100.000.735
EC Number	200-808-5
PubChem CID	5717413
UNII	YND5ZT5BS3
CompTox Dashboard (EPA)	DTXSID30861621
- InChI: InChI=1S/C12H9N3O4/c16-10-5-6-11(12(17)7-10)14-13-8-1-3-9(4-2-8)15(18)19/h1-7,16-17H/b14-13+ Key: NGPGYVQZGRJHFJ-BUHFOSPRSA-N; InChI=1/C12H9N3O4/c16-10-5-6-11(12(17)7-10)14-13-8-1-3-9(4-2-8)15(18)19/h1-7,16-17H/b14-13+ Key: NGPGYVQZGRJHFJ-BUHFOSPRBO
- SMILES: Oc2cc(O)ccc2/N=N/c1ccc(cc1)[N+]([O-])=O; Oc2cc(O)ccc2/N=N/c1ccc(cc1)N(=O)=O

Properties
Chemical formula	C_{12}H_{9}N_{3}O_{4}
Molar mass	259.318 g mol^{−1}
Appearance	dark red to brown crystalline powder
Density	1.45 g/cm^{3}
Solubility in water	1 g/L H_{2}O; 4 g/L Ethanol

Hazards
Flash point	261.7 °C (503.1 °F; 534.8 K)
- Except where otherwise noted, data are given for materials in their standard state (at 25 °C [77 °F], 100 kPa). verify (what is ?) Infobox references

Azo violet (pH indicator)
below pH 11.0		above pH 13.0
(yellow) 11.0	⇌	13.0 (violet)

Azo violet (Magneson I; p-nitrobenzeneazoresorcinol) is an azo compound with the chemical formula C_{12}H_{9}N_{3}O_{4}. It is used commercially as a violet dye and experimentally as a pH indicator, appearing yellow below pH 11, and violet above pH 13. It also turns deep blue in the presence of magnesium salt in a slightly alkaline, or basic, environment. Azo violet may also be used to test for the presence of ammonium ions. The color of ammonium chloride or ammonium hydroxide solution will vary depending upon the concentration of azo violet used. Magneson I is used to test Be also; it produces an orange-red lake with Be(II) in alkaline medium.

== Properties ==
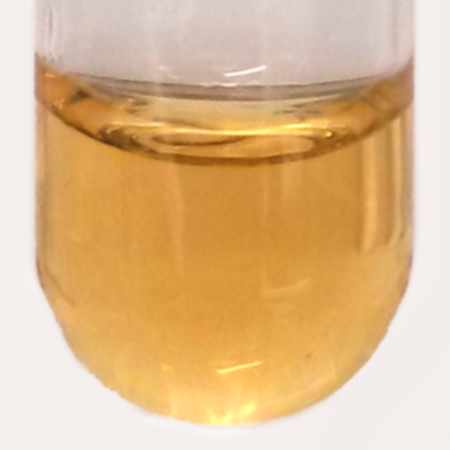
Azo violet at pH ~7.

The intense color from which the compound gets its name results from irradiation and subsequent excitation and relaxation of the extended π electron system across the R-N=N-R' linked phenols. Absorption of these electrons falls in the visible region of the electromagnetic spectrum. Azo violet's intense indigo color (λ_{max} 432 nm) approximates Pantone R: 102 G: 15 B: 240.

== Synthesis ==
Azo violet can be synthesised by reacting 4-nitroaniline with nitrous acid (generated in situ with an acid and a nitrite salt) to produce a diazonium intermediate. This is then reacted with resorcinol, dissolved in a sodium hydroxide solution, via an azo coupling reaction.

This is consistent with the generalized strategy for preparing azo dyes.

== Reactivity ==
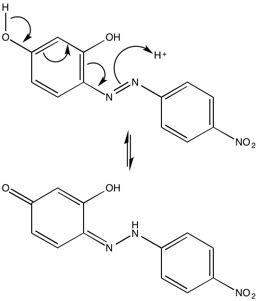
Tautomerization of Azo Violet

The chemical character of azo violet may be attributed to its azo group (-N=N-), six-membered rings, and hydroxyl side groups. Due to steric repulsions, azo violet is most stable in the trans-configuration, but isomerization of azo dyes by irradiation is not uncommon. The para-position tautomerization of azo violet provides mechanical insight into the behavior of the compound in an acidic environment, and thus its use as a basic pH indicator.

The predicted ^{1}H-NMR of pure azo violet shows the hydroxyl protons as the most deshielded and acidic protons. The participation of these hydroxyl groups' electron-donation to the conjugated π system likewise influences azo violet's λ_{max} and pK_{a} value.

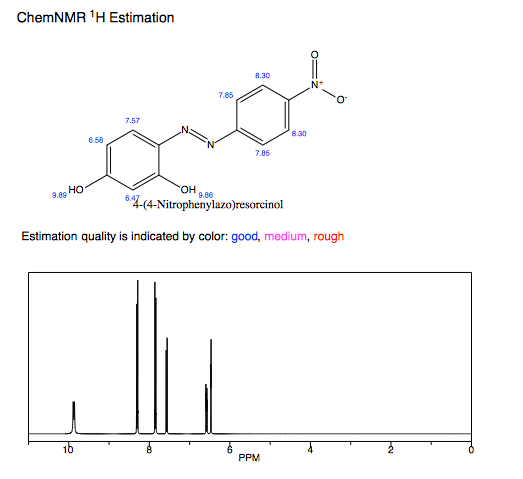
Pure Azo Violet NMR
