= Magnesium nickel hydride =

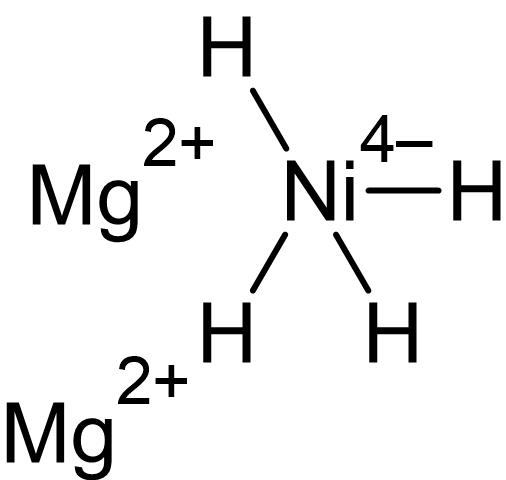

Names
- IUPAC name Magnesium nickel hydride
- Other names Nickel magnesium hydride

Identifiers
CAS Number	Mg_{2}NiD_{4}:: 77340-45-5
3D model (JSmol)	Interactive image
- InChI: InChI=1S/2Mg.Ni.4H/q2*+2;;4*-1 Key: XJFICWYDVPSDKB-UHFFFAOYSA-N
- SMILES: [H-].[H-].[H-].[H-].[Mg+2].[Mg+2].[Ni]

Properties
Chemical formula	Mg_{2}[NiH_{4}]
Molar mass	111.335 g·mol^{−1}
Appearance	Reddish-brown crystalline solid
Density	2.71 g/cm^{3}
- Except where otherwise noted, data are given for materials in their standard state (at 25 °C [77 °F], 100 kPa). Infobox references

Magnesium nickel hydride is the chemical compound with formula Mg_{2}[NiH_{4}]. It is a reddish-brown crystalline solid. It contains 3.6% by weight of hydrogen and has been studied as a potential hydrogen storage medium.

== Synthesis ==
The compound can be obtained by heating magnesium and nickel metal powders in hydrogen.

2 Mg + Ni + 2 H_{2} → Mg_{2}[NiH_{4}]

The intermetallic compound Mg_{2}Ni reacts with hydrogen at 350 °C (662 °F) to yield Mg_{2}[NiH_{4}].

== Structure ==
It consists of Mg^{2+} cations and [NiH_{4}]^{4−} anions. It is in a form of a monoclinic crystals that transform into the cubic crystals at 220 °C (428 °F).
