= Methitural =

Chemical compound

Clinical data
- ATC code: None

Identifiers
- IUPAC name: 5-[2-(methylsulfanyl)ethyl]-5-(2-pentanyl)-2-thioxodihydro-4,6(1H,5H)-pyrimidinedione
- CAS Number: 467-43-6 730-68-7 (no salt)
- PubChem CID: 3032307
- ChemSpider: 2297317
- UNII: DZQ457UJ3Y
- ChEMBL: ChEMBL2104624
- CompTox Dashboard (EPA): DTXSID10861962

Chemical and physical data
- Formula: C_{12}H_{20}N_{2}O_{2}S_{2}
- Molar mass: 288.42 g·mol^{−1}
- 3D model (JSmol): Interactive image
- SMILES: O=C1NC(=S)NC(=O)C1(C(C)CCC)CCSC
- InChI: InChI=1S/C12H20N2O2S2/c1-4-5-8(2)12(6-7-18-3)9(15)13-11(17)14-10(12)16/h8H,4-7H2,1-3H3,(H2,13,14,15,16,17); Key:KEMCRVSPPRNENL-UHFFFAOYSA-N

Methitural (INN; Neraval, Thiogenal), or methitural sodium, also known as methioturiate, is a barbiturate derivative which was marketed in the 1950s in Europe (in Germany and Italy) as an ultra-short-acting intravenous anesthetic.

== Synthesis ==
Methitural synthesis: Zima, Von Werder, U.S. patent 2,802,827 (1957 to E. Merck).

A somewhat more complex side chain is incorporated by alkylation of the carbanion of the substituted cyanoacetate (1) with 2-chloroethylmethyl sulfide (2). Condensation of the resulting cyanoester (3) with thiourea followed by hydrolysis of the resulting imine affords methitural.

== See also ==
- Barbiturate
