= 1,3-Bis(3-(dimethylamino)propyl)urea =

Chemical compound

1,3-Bis[3-(dimethylamino)propyl]urea

Names
- Preferred IUPAC name N,N′-Bis[3-(dimethylamino)propyl]urea

Identifiers
CAS Number	52338-87-1
3D model (JSmol)	Interactive image
ChemSpider	94040
ECHA InfoCard	100.052.584
EC Number	257-861-2
PubChem CID	104163
UNII	46AB57LR4N
CompTox Dashboard (EPA)	DTXSID4068741
- InChI: InChI=1S/C11H26N4O/c1-14(2)9-5-7-12-11(16)13-8-6-10-15(3)4/h5-10H2,1-4H3,(H2,12,13,16) Key: FCQPNTOQFPJCMF-UHFFFAOYSA-N
- SMILES: CN(C)CCCNC(=O)NCCCN(C)C

Properties
Chemical formula	C_{11}H_{26}N_{4}O
Molar mass	230.356 g·mol^{−1}

Hazards
- GHS labelling
Pictograms	(GHS05: Corrosive) (GHS07: Exclamation mark)
Signal word	Danger
Hazard statements	H318, H412
Precautionary statements	P261, P264, P264+P265, P272, P273, P280, P302+P352, P305+P351+P338, P305+P354+P338, P317, P321, P333+P317, P337+P317, P362+P364, P501
- Except where otherwise noted, data are given for materials in their standard state (at 25 °C [77 °F], 100 kPa). Infobox references

1,3-Bis[3-(dimethylamino)propyl]urea is an aliphatic organic chemical principally used as a curing agent in epoxy chemistry and a blowing agent in the polyurethane foam industry. It is on TSCA and also on EINECS and thus REACH registered.

== Uses ==
As the material has tertiary amine functionality, it finds use as a catalyst for polyurethane foam production. The molecule has two secondary amines and thus can be used to cure epoxy resin based materials. Other uses include as a propellant and also blowing agents. The amine functionality allows it to be used as an intermediate to synthesize other compounds.
