= Clorprenaline =

Bronchodilator

Clinical data
- Other names: Chlorprenaline; Isoprophenamine; Compound 20025; L-20025; 2-Chloro-β-hydroxy-N-isopropylphenethylamine
- Drug class: Sympathomimetic; Bronchodilator; Sympathomimetic

Identifiers
- IUPAC name: 1-(2-chlorophenyl)-2-(propan-2-ylamino)ethanol
- CAS Number: 3811-25-4 5588-22-7 (hydrochloride)
- PubChem CID: 2810
- ChemSpider: 2708
- UNII: 3W4327W76O
- KEGG: D01835
- ChEBI: CHEBI:146226
- ChEMBL: ChEMBL1902627
- CompTox Dashboard (EPA): DTXSID3048316
- ECHA InfoCard: 100.021.175

Chemical and physical data
- Formula: C_{11}H_{16}ClNO
- Molar mass: 213.71 g·mol^{−1}
- 3D model (JSmol): Interactive image
- SMILES: CC(C)NCC(C1=CC=CC=C1Cl)O
- InChI: InChI=1S/C11H16ClNO/c1-8(2)13-7-11(14)9-5-3-4-6-10(9)12/h3-6,8,11,13-14H,7H2,1-2H3; Key:SSMSBSWKLKKXGG-UHFFFAOYSA-N

Clorprenaline (INN, USAN, BAN), also known as isoprophenamine and known as clorprenaline hydrochloride (USAN, JAN) in the case of the hydrochloride salt, is a sympathomimetic and bronchodilator medication which is marketed in Japan. It acts as a β-adrenergic receptor agonist or as a β-sympathomimetic. Brand names of clorprenaline in Japan are numerous and include Asnormal, Bazarl, Bronchon, Clopinerin, Conselt, Cosmoline, Fusca, Kalutein, Pentadoll, Restanolon, and Troberin. The drug was first described in the literature by 1956.
