= Sambubiose =

Names
- IUPAC name 2-O-β-d-Xylopyranosyl-β-d-glucopyranose
- Systematic IUPAC name (2R,3R,4S,5S,6R)-6-(hydroxymethyl)-3-[(2S,3R,4S,5R)-3,4,5-trihydroxyoxan-2-yl]oxyoxane-2,4,5-triol

Identifiers
CAS Number	26388-68-1
3D model (JSmol)	Interactive image
ChEBI	CHEBI:145629
ChemSpider	29434721
PubChem CID	69620814
CompTox Dashboard (EPA)	DTXSID601028801
- InChI: InChI=1S/C11H20O10/c12-1-4-6(15)7(16)9(10(18)20-4)21-11-8(17)5(14)3(13)2-19-11/h3-18H,1-2H2/t3-,4-,5+,6-,7+,8-,9-,10-,11+/m1/s1 Key: BUEBVQCTEJTADB-IGQSMMPPSA-N; InChI=1/C11H20O10/c12-1-4-6(15)7(16)9(10(18)20-4)21-11-8(17)5(14)3(13)2-19-11/h3-18H,1-2H2/t3-,4-,5+,6-,7+,8-,9-,10-,11+/m1/s1 Key: BUEBVQCTEJTADB-IGQSMMPPBU
- SMILES: C1[C@H]([C@@H]([C@H]([C@@H](O1)O[C@@H]2[C@H]([C@@H]([C@H](O[C@H]2O)CO)O)O)O)O)O

Properties
Chemical formula	C_{11}H_{20}O_{10}
Molar mass	312.271 g·mol^{−1}
- Except where otherwise noted, data are given for materials in their standard state (at 25 °C [77 °F], 100 kPa). verify (what is ?) Infobox references

Sambubiose is a disaccharide. It is the β-D-xylosyl-(1→2)-β-D-glucose.

Sambubiose is a component of some glycoside pigments. The fruits of Viburnum dentatum appear blue. One of the major pigments is cyanidin 3-sambubioside, but the total mixture is very complex. Sambubiosides with anthocyanidins can also be found in Matthiola incana.
