= Phosphaphenalene =

Some isomeric phosphaphenalenes

1-Phosphaphenalene
CAS RN 1585965-09-8

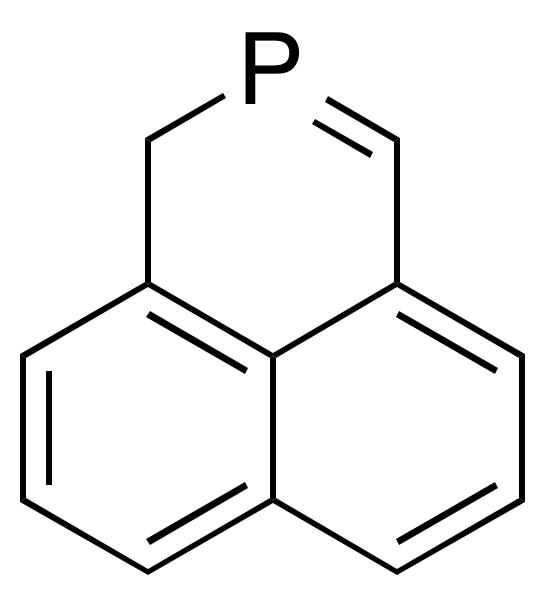
1H-2-phosphaphenalene
CAS RN: 87954-77-6

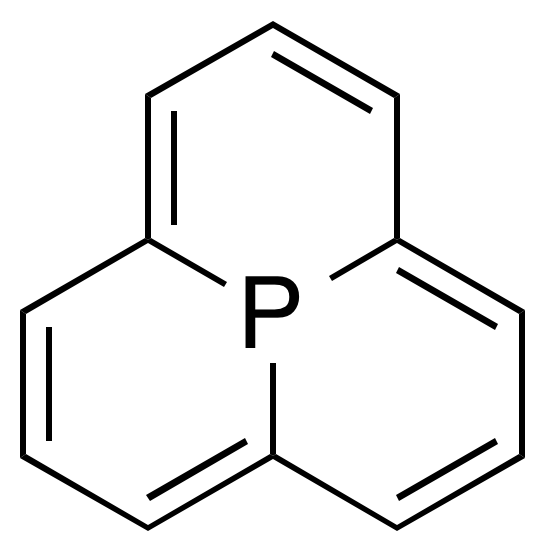
9b-Phosphaphenalene
CAS RN: 25043-12-3

Phosphaphenalenes are a class of heterocyclic aromatic compounds containing phosphorus with molecular formula C_{12}H_{9}P. It is related to phenalene C_{13}H_{10}, where one of its carbons is replaced by phosphorus (phenalene is a polycyclic aromatic hydrocarbon). Phosphaphenalene can exist in a number of isomers depending on where in the ring system the phosphorus atom is placed. The phosphorus atom in these molecules has unusual properties, in particular changing its affinity as an electron acceptor when exposed to certain wavelengths of light. This makes phosphaphenalenes useful in optoelectronic applications such as temperature-dependent luminescence and electrochromism (reversibly changes colour when electricity is applied).
