= Lauroyl chloride =

Names
- IUPAC name Dodecanoyl chloride

Identifiers
CAS Number	112-16-3
3D model (JSmol)	Interactive image
ChEMBL	ChEMBL3561663
ChemSpider	7874
ECHA InfoCard	100.003.583
EC Number	203-941-7
PubChem CID	8166
UNII	9LHL10777I
CompTox Dashboard (EPA)	DTXSID5044368
- InChI: InChI=1S/C12H23ClO/c1-2-3-4-5-6-7-8-9-10-11-12(13)14/h2-11H2,1H3 Key: NQGIJDNPUZEBRU-UHFFFAOYSA-N
- SMILES: CCCCCCCCCCCC(=O)Cl

Properties
Chemical formula	C_{12}H_{23}ClO
Molar mass	218.77 g·mol^{−1}
Appearance	colorless liquid
Density	0.93 g/cm^{3}
Melting point	−17 °C (1 °F; 256 K)
Boiling point	145 °C (293 °F; 418 K) 18 torr

Hazards
- GHS labelling
Pictograms	(GHS05: Corrosive) (GHS07: Exclamation mark)
Signal word	Danger
Hazard statements	H290, H314, H317
Precautionary statements	P234, P260, P264, P264+P265, P272, P280, P301+P330+P331, P302+P352, P302+P361+P354, P304+P340, P305+P354+P338, P316, P317, P321, P333+P313, P362+P364, P363, P390, P405, P501
- Except where otherwise noted, data are given for materials in their standard state (at 25 °C [77 °F], 100 kPa). Infobox references

Lauroyl chloride is the organic compound with the formula CH_{3}(CH_{2})_{10}COCl. It is the acid chloride of lauric acid. Lauroyl chloride is a standard reagent for installing the lauroyl group. It is mainly produced as a precursor to surfactants such as sodium lauroyl sarcosinate. It is also used to produce dilauroyl peroxide, which is widely used in free-radical polymerizations.

Lauroyl chloride is a substrate for diverse reactions characteristic of acid chlorides. With base, it converts to laurone, a ketone with the formula [CH_{3}(CH_{2})_{10}]_{2}CO. With sodium azide, it reacts to give undecyl isocyanate via a Curtius rearrangement of the acyl azide.
