= Nealbarbital =

Chemical compound

Clinical data
- Other names: Nealbarbital, Censedal
- ATC code: none

Identifiers
- IUPAC name: 5-allyl-5-(1,1-dimethylpropyl)pyrimidine-2,4,6(1H,3H,5H)-trione
- CAS Number: 561-83-1
- PubChem CID: 521716
- ChemSpider: 455089
- UNII: 25ATP958PA
- CompTox Dashboard (EPA): DTXSID70871769
- ECHA InfoCard: 100.008.386

Chemical and physical data
- Formula: C_{12}H_{18}N_{2}O_{3}
- Molar mass: 238.287 g·mol^{−1}
- 3D model (JSmol): Interactive image
- SMILES: O=C1NC(=O)NC(=O)C1(CC(C)(C)C)C\C=C
- InChI: InChI=1S/C12H18N2O3/c1-5-6-12(7-11(2,3)4)8(15)13-10(17)14-9(12)16/h5H,1,6-7H2,2-4H3,(H2,13,14,15,16,17); Key:YHKPTICJRUESOY-UHFFFAOYSA-N

Nealbarbital (Censedal) is a barbiturate derivative developed by Aktiebolaget Pharmacia in the 1950s. It has sedative and hypnotic effects, and was used for the treatment of insomnia.
