= Menthyl acetate =

l-Menthyl acetate
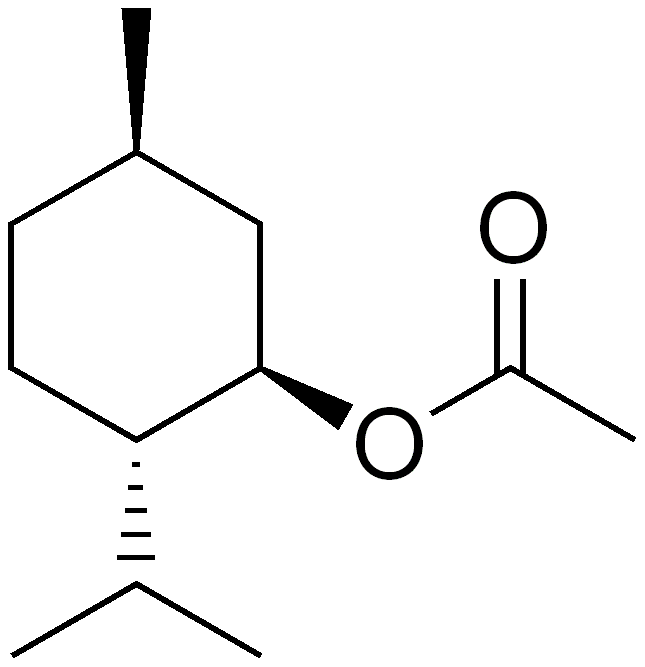

Names
- IUPAC name (1R,3R,4S)-p-Menthan-3-yl acetate
- Systematic IUPAC name (1R,2S,5R)-5-Methyl-2-(propan-2-yl)cyclohexyl acetate
- Other names (1R)-(−)-Menthyl acetate Ethanoic (1R,2S,5R)-2-isopropyl-5-methylcyclohexane-1-carboxylate Acetic (1R,2S,5R)-2-isopropyl-5-methylcyclohexane-1-carboxylate

Identifiers
CAS Number	2623-23-6
3D model (JSmol)	Interactive image
ChemSpider	191402
ECHA InfoCard	100.018.252
PubChem CID	220674
UNII	W8C5F4H1OA
CompTox Dashboard (EPA)	DTXSID7051472
- InChI: InChI=1S/C12H22O2/c1-8(2)11-6-5-9(3)7-12(11)14-10(4)13/h8-9,11-12H,5-7H2,1-4H3/t9-,11+,12-/m1/s1 Key: XHXUANMFYXWVNG-ADEWGFFLSA-N; InChI=1/C12H22O2/c1-8(2)11-6-5-9(3)7-12(11)14-10(4)13/h8-9,11-12H,5-7H2,1-4H3/t9-,11+,12-/m1/s1 Key: XHXUANMFYXWVNG-ADEWGFFLBI
- SMILES: C[C@@H]1CC[C@H]([C@@H](C1)OC(=O)C)C(C)C

Properties
Chemical formula	C_{12}H_{22}O_{2}
Molar mass	198.30 g/mol
Density	0.92 g/mL
Boiling point	229–230 °C (444–446 °F; 502–503 K)

Hazards
Flash point	77 °C (171 °F; 350 K)
- Except where otherwise noted, data are given for materials in their standard state (at 25 °C [77 °F], 100 kPa). verify (what is ?) Infobox references

Menthyl acetate is a natural monoterpene which contributes to the smell and flavor of peppermint. It is the acetate ester of menthol. Menthyl acetate constitutes 3–5% of the volatile oil of mentha piperita, contributing to its smell and flavour.
