= Buturon =

Names
- Preferred IUPAC name 1-but-3-yn-2-yl-3-(4-chlorophenyl)-1-methylurea

Identifiers
CAS Number	3766-60-7
3D model (JSmol)	Interactive image
ChEBI	CHEBI:82199
ChEMBL	ChEMBL3185882
ChemSpider	18451
ECHA InfoCard	100.021.080
KEGG	C19074
PubChem CID	19587
UNII	1961BJU91F
CompTox Dashboard (EPA)	DTXSID5041699
- InChI: InChI=1S/C12H13ClN2O/c1-4-9(2)15(3)12(16)14-11-7-5-10(13)6-8-11/h1,5-9H,2-3H3,(H,14,16) Key: BYYMILHAKOURNM-UHFFFAOYSA-N
- SMILES: CC(C#C)N(C)C(=O)NC1=CC=C(C=C1)Cl

Properties
Chemical formula	C_{12}H_{13}ClN_{2}O
Molar mass	236.70 g·mol^{−1}
Appearance	Colourless crystalline solid
Density	1.233
Melting point	145 °C (293 °F; 418 K)
Solubility in water	30 mg/L
Solubility in acetone	279 g/L
Solubility in methanol	128 g/L
Solubility in benzene	9.8 g/L
Vapor pressure	0.01 mPa

Hazards
- GHS labelling
Pictograms	(GHS07: Exclamation mark)
Signal word	Danger
Hazard statements	H302, H311
Precautionary statements	P262, P264, P270, P280, P301+P317, P302+P352, P316, P321, P330, P361+P364, P405, P501
Flash point	>100°C
- Lethal dose or concentration (LD, LC)
LD_{50} (median dose)	>1791 mg/kg (rat, oral); 500 mg/kg (rabbit, dermal)
- Except where otherwise noted, data are given for materials in their standard state (at 25 °C [77 °F], 100 kPa). Infobox references

Buturon is a methylurea, phenylurea herbicide, used to control grassy weeds, largely on cereals. It is now considered obsolete, having been first released as Eptapur in 1962.

Buturon's HRAC classification is Group C (Australia), Group C2 (global) or Group 5 (numeric).

== Soil behaviour ==
Buturon rapidly degrades in the environment, and is not persistent, though some metabolites are.

Wheat metabolises about 25% of buturon after seven days. Nutrient deficient plants metabolise it significantly faster though. The main metabolite groups are carbamates, unstable products, a group containing p-chloroacetanilide and conjugates. Nutrient-deficiency also decreases absorption and translocation, which is conjectured to passively rely on the flow of water. Plant metabolism may occur independently in roots and shoots.

Buturon has low volatility.

== Safety ==
In a trial on mice given high daily doses of buturon, 100 to 400 mg/kg/day, and for comparison the LD_{50} is 1791 mg/kg, buturon induced postimplantative loss and retardation of development at doses over 300 mg/kg/day, and a dose-dependent trend of cleft palate, wavy or fused ribs and hypoplasia of the upper jaw.

Rats metabolise buturon within 4 days and remove 68% and 20% by urine and faeces respectively.

== Usage ==
Buturon is usually sold as a wettable powder, to be applied on berry fruits, maize, vines, and cereals including wheat and barley, to control such weeds as spurge, annual meadow grass and foxtails.

It has been sold under the tradenames Arisan, Basfitox and Eptapur.
