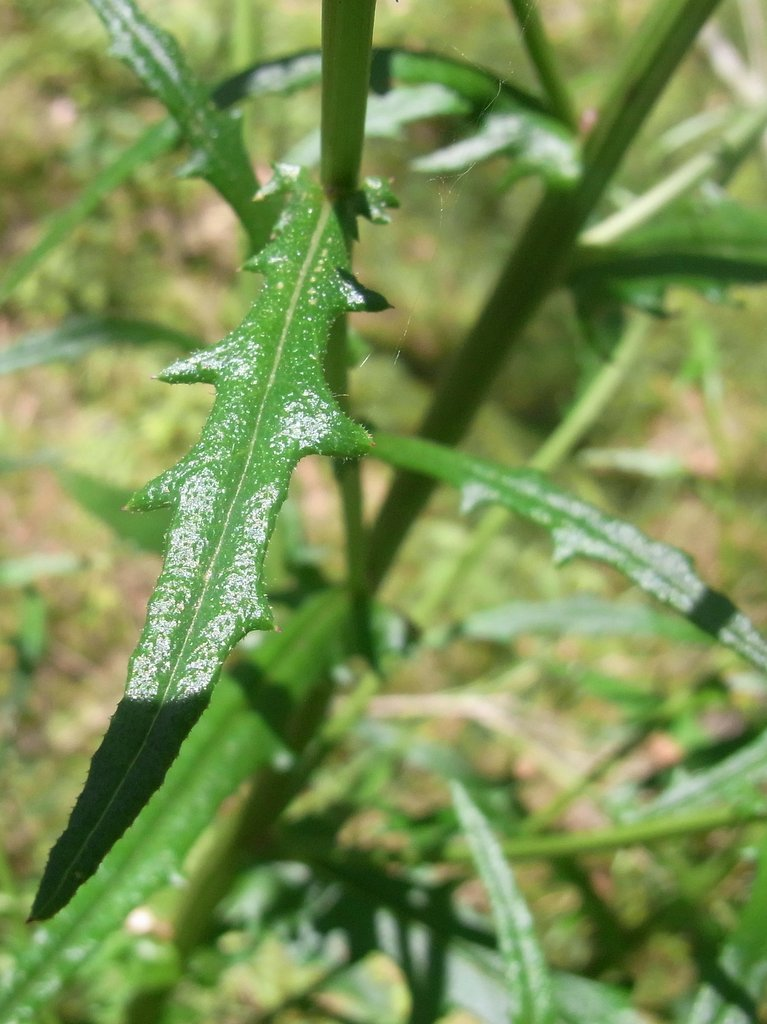
- Chatswood West, Australia

Scientific classification
- Kingdom: Plantae
- Clade: Tracheophytes
- Clade: Angiosperms
- Clade: Eudicots
- Clade: Asterids
- Order: Asterales
- Family: Asteraceae
- Genus: Senecio
- Species: S. hispidulus

Binomial name
- Senecio hispidulus A.Rich.

= Senecio hispidulus =

Species of flowering plant in the daisy family

Senecio hispidulus, the hill fireweed or rough groundsel, is a species of flowering plant in the daisy family. It is found in many parts of Australia.

== Description ==
Senecio hispidulus is an erect herb with an annual or a short lived perennial life cycle and can grow up to 2 metres (6 ft 7 in) tall, but is usually between 30–100 cm (12–39 in) tall. It is a dicotyledonous herb which means the plant is vascular and that it flowers. The plant flowers many small inflorescence of a yellow or pale-yellow color. The herb is sparsely to moderately course-hairy, with shorter hairs on upper leaf surface and longer, denser and jointed hairs on lower surface (A. Rich, 1834). The primary stem is usually simple and is covered in conspicuous soft bristly hairs. S. hispidulus has a woody base which develops into a ribbed mid stem. Mid stem leaves are evenly spaced and sized, usually 70–150 mm (2.8–5.9 in) in length. Its leaf color varying from dark green to yellow green and sometimes shaded with red. Also upper stem can be tinged with purple or red, and is usually triggered by environmental temperatures. The larger and lower leaf margins are sinuately pinnately lobed being usually three to five toothed, having a terminal tooth which is longer than that of the laterals. The uppermost smaller leaves, more in proximity to plant inflorescence are often dentate and not lobed. Plant inflorescence usually of many capitula (flower heads). Overall number of capitula contained usually between 14 and 48 containing 25 florets per capitula. Although this can be dependent on which component of S. hispidulus is found in New Zealand. Mature floret size usually between 6 mm and 12 mm long and 4 mm wide. The more mature and lobed leaves carry a very distinctive look to them, being a relatively narrow leaf. It has between 2 and 5 lobes along the side margins of the leaf. The seeds of S. hispidulus are hairy, which can be related to its name in Latin where senecio means 'old man' which can be linked to the 'bearded' or hairy seeds. S. hispidulus has small seeds usually around 0.5 mm wide and 2 mm long. In New Zealand S. hispidulus is represented by two components. These two components are geographically segregated as one grows in the area north of 39° south, where the other component grows to the south from that point. The main differences between the two components include the number of capitula and the number of florets per capitula counted on a mature plant. The northern component having 14 capitula counted, which contain between 26 and 31 florets each. Whereas the southern component counts 48 capitula with between 17 and 24 florets on each capitula.

== Distribution ==
=== Natural global range ===
S. hispidulus is indigenous to New Zealand and Australia. In Australia it is predominantly found in the state of New South Wales. Although S. hispidulus is also found in Tasmania, Western Australia, and Queensland.

=== New Zealand range ===
In the North Island the dominant ranges of S. hispidulus are vicinity of Auckland isthmus, Coromandel, Ōpōtiki, and Wellington Province (A. Rich, 1934). In the South Island plant range includes Nelson, Marlborough, and North Canterbury. Although there is some variation in two recognized components among New Zealand material of S. hispidulus which has been collected. Whereby D. G. Drury suggests that the plants in the north of the North Island may have been naturalized in New Zealand, whereas there is little evidence to decide whether the plants from the northern South Island and Wellington area are indigenous or naturalized. As stated before the two components of S. hispidulus are geographically dispersed as there is a documented break in the range of S. hispidulus between latitude 38° and 40° south which separates the two components of S. hispidulus. This fact therefore does not support the hybridization hypothesis, which according to Drury "lacks support" on geographical basis.

=== Habitat preference ===
The habitat of S. hispidulus can vary from coastal to montane environments, especially in sites where indigenous vegetation are burned or cleared recently. Usually growing in altitudes from sea level to 457 metres (1,500 ft) above sea level. The herb is prevalent in dry bare or disturbed habitats, such as recently cleared or burned areas. Primarily found in unstable environment. Also forest margins, coastal sites, and riverbeds are common place for S. hispidulus.

== Life cycle and phenology ==
S. hispidulus can grow all year round depending on environmental circumstances, which is one of the reasons various specimens can have different heights. Some plants in good growing conditions can grow all year round, whereas other plants in suboptimal conditions will not be able to do this. This fact is one example of the versatility of the herb, which is able to easily adapt to its environment. This versatility is also demonstrated in the flowering period of S. hispidulus which is estimated to be from October to April, but is differently assessed by New Zealand Plant Conservation Network to last from August to May which is a very large time period for flowering to occur. But it is safe to say the plant flowers usually between spring and summer. S. hispidulus is known to be a strongly invasive species which is easily grown from seed. When flowering S. hispidulus produces both polliniferous (pollen bearing) florets and female florets. This is likely to increase the plants' probability to reproduce in a scenario where cross pollination might be hindered. A distinction in the number of polliniferous florets to female florets has been discovered between the two different components of S. hispidulus in New Zealand. The Northern component of S. hispidulus has been documented to grow between nine and eleven polliniferous florets per capitulum (cluster of small florets), whereas the southern component is recorded to carry between five and eight polliniferous florets per capitulum. Both the northern and southern components carry a more equal number of female florets compared to the florets with the polliniferous stamen. This might indicate a different need for pollen carrying flowers between the two S. hispidulus components in New Zealand.

== Diet/prey/predators ==
=== Diet and foraging ===
S. hispidulus like to grow in forest margins and clearings, disturbed pasture, coastal sites, and waste places. It grows in arable and waste land, gardens. Easily grown in fresh seed. The plant grows on many types of soil and can survival in large ranges of habitats. The optimum temperature of germination is at 25 °C (77 °F) while the greatest flush of germination is at 9 °C (48 °F). The maximum temperature of germination is about 35 °C. It is reported by Koch(1970), better germination with alternating low and high temperature. Only if giving some light to seeds, it can germinate, and even intermittent low level of daylight is sufficient. Fireweed is very weedy and invasive.

=== Predators, parasites, and diseases ===
S. hispidulus often has a rust fungus attacking it. Hosts of magpie moth, Nyctemera annulata. It is very weedy and invasive. Potentially poisonous, but not usually eaten by stock. Cattle, horses, and several other livestock animals may eat it.

== Other information ==
=== Control ===
S. hispidulus is normally easy to control. In most situations, the ways people use to control weeds are divided into two groups. The one is chemical ways like using herbicides, the other is physical ways like shading. But fireweed is resistant to some kinds of herbicides which is usually used in cropping, such as trifluralin, oryzalin, pendimethalin, and bromacil. As a plant which only has a shallow and fibrous root system, hill fireweed is easily controlled by pulling out from land or using a hoe. However the seeds of fireweed can be delivered too quickly by wind to control, which means if a fireweed or a seed of it escape from land cleaning, it will take up the land again and people will fail to control it. What is more, lawn mower is also used instead of handing. Shading is an easy and efficient way to control it. Using mulch to cover the land where fireweed is found will prevent seed from germinating from in soil. And people should be careful about preventing seeds from blowing on the top of the mulch and kill first few plants which grow on the top of mulch as soon as possible. All in all, weeds need to be stopped setting seed around the container plants, or else seeds will germinate in the sterile potting mix planter bags, and it will cause problems.

=== Poisoning ===
It is believed to lead to more livestock poisoning and death (Heywood 1978, Lawrence 1981). Senecio species of plants are containing pyrrolizidine alkaloids (PA) which is harmful for human. Because they lead to the damages of liver and lungs, they are related to poisonings and losses. PA may be considered as one kind of carcinogenesis.

=== Herbicides resistance ===
S. hispidulus have surprising adaptability which make it remain with human, it means fireweeds often survival from controlling and weeds again. From 1900s, people noticed the pesticides resistance by diseases and insects. And 50 years later, the resistance of pesticide became widespread with the use of synthetic organic pesticides. It means even though higher concentration of pesticides had been used to control fireweeds, it became inefficient. It was shown in 1973 that simazine and related compounds stop photosynthesis in susceptible (S) biotype but not efficient in resistant (R) biotype. In S-plant the herbicide set relationships between protein and electron transport in photosystem is inhibited. By around 1985, some reports showing that there were relationships between triazine-resistance and decrease productivity in some way. Whatever under non-competitive or competitive situations, R-plants have more leaf area tissue and a better leaf area ratio, but R-plant have less productive tissue than S-plant. All in all, S-biotype fireweed is greater productors not only of biomass but also of reproductive structures. In 1987, it found that in more than 2 cm depth of soil, R-fireweed have greater longevity than S-fireweed while in 0 to 2 cm depth of soil, both biotypes demonstrated different longevity according to the environment and management practices.
