= C6H9N3 =

The molecular formula C_{6}H_{9}N_{3} may refer to:

- Ampyzine, a central nervous system stimulant
- Cyanomethine, trimer of acetonitrile
- GT-2203
- IDPN (chemical), a neurotoxin with ototoxic and hepatotoxic effects
- Triaminobenzene
