= Nitrofor =

Herbicide used in the Soviet Union

Names
- Preferred IUPAC name N,N-diethyl-2,6-dinitro-4-(trifluoromethyl)aniline

Identifiers
CAS Number	5254-27-3
3D model (JSmol)	Interactive image
ChEBI	CHEBI:180606
ChemSpider	71247
EC Number	982-770-6
PubChem CID	78912
CompTox Dashboard (EPA)	DTXSID30200531
- InChI: InChI=1S/C11H12F3N3O4/c1-3-15(4-2)10-8(16(18)19)5-7(11(12,13)14)6-9(10)17(20)21/h5-6H,3-4H2,1-2H3 Key: NLLHXVBITYTYHA-UHFFFAOYSA-N
- SMILES: CCN(CC)C1=C(C=C(C=C1[N+](=O)[O-])C(F)(F)F)[N+](=O)[O-]

Properties
Chemical formula	C_{11}H_{12}F_{3}N_{3}O_{4}
Molar mass	307.229 g·mol^{−1}

Hazards
- GHS labelling
Pictograms	(GHS06: Toxic) (GHS07: Exclamation mark) (GHS08: Health hazard) (GHS09: Environmental hazard)
Signal word	Danger
Hazard statements	H302, H317, H331, H351, H410
Precautionary statements	P203, P261, P264, P270, P271, P272, P273, P280, P301+P317, P302+P352, P304+P340, P316, P318, P321, P330, P333+P317, P362+P364, P391, P403+P233, P405, P501
- Except where otherwise noted, data are given for materials in their standard state (at 25 °C [77 °F], 100 kPa). Infobox references

Nitrofor is a dinitroaniline herbicide, useful for weed control in cabbage, tomato, and cotton crops, used in the Soviet Union. It is not approved in the EU. It can be applied at 3-6 kg/ha, and works by the inhibition of microtubule formation mode of action, making it an HRAC Group D / K3 / 3 herbicide. It appears not to be in current use anywhere.

The USSR tested it for senna (cassia acutifolia) crops. The closely related herbicide trifluralin was slightly more effective than nitrofor, but had to be imported to the USSR, whereas nitrofor was produced domestically. Also tested, were prometryn, simazine, linuron and maloran, with trifluralin and prometryn being found most effective.

In a Soviet test in the 1970s, nitrofor at 3 kg/Ha increased the levels of NPK (nitrogen, phosphorus and potassium), in leached heavy-loam chernozem soil. The nitrofor was pre-plant incorporated. Final NPK levels were 1.6-2.0 times greater in castor beans and 5 times greater in the seed.

An American test in the 1960s compared trifluralin analogs, one being nitrofor, which is equivalent to trifluralin with ethyl groups instead of propyls. Trifluralin itself was the most active agent, however nitrofor was among a few analogs recommended for further testing, still having high herbicidal activity but offering greater crop safety.
