= Nitralin =

Weed control herbicide

Names
- Preferred IUPAC name 4-(methylsulfonyl)-2,6-dinitro-N,N-dipropylaniline
- Other names: Nitralin; Planavin (Brand name); SD 11831 or SD 11 831 (development code); 4-(Methylsulfonyl)-2,6-dinitro-N,N-dipropylbenzenamine

Identifiers
CAS Number	4726-14-1
3D model (JSmol)	Interactive image
ChEBI	CHEBI:82190
ChEMBL	ChEMBL1256763
ChemSpider	19622
ECHA InfoCard	100.022.926
EC Number	225-219-0
KEGG	C19064
PubChem CID	20848
UNII	697W0VS4HQ
UN number	3077
CompTox Dashboard (EPA)	DTXSID9042203
- InChI: InChI=1S/C13H19N3O6S/c1-4-6-14(7-5-2)13-11(15(17)18)8-10(23(3,21)22)9-12(13)16(19)20/h8-9H,4-7H2,1-3H3 Key: UMKANAFDOQQUKE-UHFFFAOYSA-N
- SMILES: CCCN(CCC)C1=C(C=C(C=C1[N+](=O)[O-])S(=O)(=O)C)[N+](=O)[O-]

Properties
Chemical formula	C_{13}H_{19}N_{3}O_{6}S
Molar mass	345.37 g·mol^{−1}
Appearance	Yellow/orange powder
Odor	Mild odour
Density	1.001
Melting point	151 °C (304 °F; 424 K)
Boiling point	225 °C; 437 °F; 498 K (decomposes)
Solubility in water	0.0006 g/L
Solubility in acetone	360 g/L
Solubility in DMSO	330 g/L
Solubility in 2-nitropropane	250 g/L
Vapor pressure	0.2 × 10^{−6} mm Hg (25°C)

Hazards
- GHS labelling
Pictograms	(GHS09: Environmental hazard)
Hazard statements	H228, H410
Precautionary statements	P273, P391, P501
Autoignition temperature	224 °C; 435 °F; 497 K
- Lethal dose or concentration (LD, LC)
LD_{50} (median dose)	>5000 mg/kg (rats and mice); >2000 mg/kg (waterfowl)
LC_{50} (median concentration)	46 mg/L (fish)
- Except where otherwise noted, data are given for materials in their standard state (at 25 °C [77 °F], 100 kPa). Infobox references

Nitralin is a selective preëmergent dinitroaniline herbicide that is closely related to trifluralin, and released two years later in 1966. Today it is largely obsolete. It was used in the USA, France and Australia to control annual grasses and broad-leaved weeds, and was applied on vines, crops and turf.

American farmers used 405,000 pounds (184 t) in 1974, though trifluralin still overshadowed it, with 22,960,000 pounds (10,410 t). A 1992 report mentions extensive use on potatoes, though Shell's "Planavin" trademark expired in 1989.

On ryegrass meristems, nitralin suppressed elongation and made the roots wider. After 1 hour, mitosis was reduced by 76%. Cell nuclei expanded, becoming polymorphic, and with increased ploidy levels. Other dinitroanilines have similar effects, except butralin.

Nitralin is not associated with lung cancer.

== Planavin ==
Planavin 75 was sold commercially as a wettable powder containing 75% nitralin, applied at around 2 pounds per acre (2.25 kg/Ha), equivalent to 1.5 lbs/acre of pure nitralin. Shell sold technical grade nitralin at 94% purity for manufacturing purposes.

It is also reported that nitralin is applied at 0.5-0.75 kg/Ha on light soils, and 1-1.5 kg/Ha on heavier soils with over 5% organic mass, while not being used in highly organic or peat soils.

== Environmental Behaviour ==
Soil-applied nitralin is involatile; its vapours were below the limit of detection. Water leaching is very slow. Together this makes nitralin immobile in soil, so application can be precise, though it cannot move far enough into soil to control deep-germinating weed species. Typical in-soil halflives are 30 to 60 days, and it decomposes under ultraviolet light.

== Metabolism ==
Ingested by rats, 98.5% is removed in 72 hours by urine and faeces. The metabolism is complex and produces many afterproducts.

== Comparative Performance ==
Compared to trifluralin, nitralin is more toxic to the roots and less toxic to the shoots. Trifluralin prevented emergence of most species tested; nitralin did not prevent any from emerging. At Johnsongrass control, nitralin and pendimethalin lost out to trifluralin and other dinitroaniline herbicides.

Nitralin in a 1970s trial on conifer seedbeds in Connecticut was effective at 2 lbs/ac (2.24 kg/Ha) though it damaged white spruce seedlings in one test. Of the related dinitroanilines, oryzalin was most active, and nitralin was not far off, beating trifluralin.

== Applications ==
Broadleaves Controlled	Grasses Controlled	Crops used on	Turfs used on
amsinckia, amaranth, buckhorn plantain, bull mallow, carpetweed, common plantain, cress, curly dock (from seed), dead nettle, fat hen, fiddleneck, groundsel, henbit, knotweed, lambsquarter, mallow of Nice, munyeroo, pigweed, plantain, prickly lettuce, price-of-wales feather, purslane, pussley, shepherd's purse, smartweed	Annual bluegrass, annual ryegrass, brachiaria, burr grass, cheatgrass, crabgrass, cotton panic grass, cupgrass, downy brome, finger panic grass, goosegrass, green foxtail, ryegrass, johnsongrass, pigeon grass, setaria, watergrass, wild oats, winter grass, wireweed, witchgrass, yellow foxtail	vines, soybeans, cotton, beans, groundnuts, sunflowers, tobacco, turf	bahia, bentcrass, bermuda grass, annual bluegrass, centipede, fescue, St. Augustine, zoysia, Japanese andromeda, Japanese holly, Azalea, boxwood, chrysanthemum, shasta daisy, ajuga

Nitralin is sparingly soluble in common hydrocarbon or organic solvents.
