= C6H5N3O4 =

The molecular formula C_{6}H_{5}N_{3}O_{4} may refer to:

- Dinitroanilines
  - 2,3-Dinitroaniline
  - 2,4-Dinitroaniline
  - 2,5-Dinitroaniline
  - 2,6-Dinitroaniline
  - 3,4-Dinitroaniline
  - 3,5-Dinitroaniline
