= C13H16F3N3O4 =

The molecular formula C_{13}H_{16}F_{3}N_{3}O_{4} (molar mass: 335.28 g/mol, exact mass: 335.1092 u) may refer to:

- Benfluralin
- Trifluralin
