= C13H19N3O4 =

The molecular formula C_{13}H_{19}N_{3}O_{4} may refer to:

- Dipropalin
- Pendimethalin
