= C14H16F3N3O4 =

The molecular formula C_{14}H_{16}F_{3}N_{3}O_{4} may refer to:

- Methalpropalin
- Profluralin
