= Dinitroaniline =

Class of chemical compounds

Dinitroanilines are a class of organic compounds based on dinitroaniline, with the chemical formula C_{6}H_{3}(NO_{2})_{2}NH_{2}. Six isomers exist depending on the relative positions of the amino (NH_{2}) and nitro (NO_{2}) groups: 2,3-dinitroaniline, 2,4-dinitroaniline, 2,5-dinitroaniline, 2,6-dinitroaniline, 3,4-dinitroaniline, and 3,5-dinitroaniline. An organic compound with a dinitroaniline group is also said to be a dinitroaniline.

== Uses ==
Dinitroanilines are intermediates in the preparation of various industrial chemicals including dyes and pesticides. During World War I, Germany used them as Ersatz high explosives.

There are many dinitroaniline herbicides, beginning with trifluralin in 1964. These are all 2,6-dinitroanilines, and work by inhibiting microtubule formation, have low to moderate human toxicity, high aquatic toxicity and are usually applied pre-emergently, often to control grasses and broad-leafed weeds. They include benfluralin, butralin, chlornidine, dinitramine, dipropalin, ethalfluralin, fluchloralin, isopropalin, methalpropalin, nitralin, nitrofor, oryzalin, pendimethalin, prodiamine, profluralin, and trifluralin. Trifluralin, pendimethalin are the most widely commercially used.

== Preparation ==
2,4-Dinitroaniline can be prepared by reaction of 1-chloro-2,4-dinitrobenzene with ammonia or by acid hydrolysis of 2,4-dinitroacetanilide.

2,6-Dinitroaniline can be prepared in a multistep process involving nitration and sulfonation of chlorobenzene.

== Reactions ==
A characteristic reaction of the dinitroanilines is their reduction, first to the diamine, then to the triamine, and finally to the triaminocyclohexanes. Selective conversion to the diamine can be achieved using sulfide as a reducing agent. Hydrogenation over nickel or palladium catalysts gives triaminobenzenes. Still further hydrogenation (of the ring) affords the triaminocyclohexanes.

== Examples ==
Dinitroanilines
Chemical name	2,3-Dinitroaniline	2,4-Dinitroaniline	2,5-Dinitroaniline	2,6-Dinitroaniline	3,4-Dinitroaniline	3,5-Dinitroaniline
Alternate name	2,3-Dinitro-1-aminobenzene; 2,3-Dinitrophenylamine; 2,3-Dinitraniline	2,4-Dinitro-1-aminobenzene; 2,4-Dinitrophenylamine; 2,4-Dinitraniline	2,5-Dinitro-1-aminobenzene; 2,5-Dinitrophenylamine; 2,5-Dinitraniline	2,6-Dinitro-1-aminobenzene; 2,6-Dinitrophenylamine; 2,6-Dinitraniline	3,4-Dinitro-1-aminobenzene; 3,4-Dinitrophenylamine; 3,4-Dinitraniline	3,5-Dinitro-1-aminobenzene; 3,5-Dinitrophenylamine; 3,5-Dinitraniline
Chemical structure						
CAS Number	602-03-9	97-02-9	619-18-1	606-22-4	610-41-3	618-87-1
CAS Number	26471-56-7 (isomeric mixture)					
PubChem	CID 136400 from PubChem	CID 7321 from PubChem	CID 123081 from PubChem	CID 69070 from PubChem	CID 136407 from PubChem	CID 12068 from PubChem
Chemical formula	C_{6}H_{5}N_{3}O_{4}					
Molar mass	183.12 g/mol					
Appearance	colorless to yellowish combustible powder					
Melting point		187.8 °C		136 °C (decomp.)	154–158 °C	160–162 °C
Density	1.646 g/cm (50 °C)	1.61 g/cm			1.736 g/cm	1.601 g/cm (50 °C)
Solubility	soluble in water (1–2 g/L at 20 °C)					
GHS hazard pictograms		(GHS01: Explosive) (GHS06: Toxic) (GHS08: Health hazard) (GHS09: Environmental hazard)		(GHS01: Explosive) (GHS06: Toxic) (GHS08: Health hazard)	(GHS01: Explosive) (GHS06: Toxic) (GHS08: Health hazard)	(GHS01: Explosive) (GHS06: Toxic) (GHS08: Health hazard)
H- and P-phrases		H300, H310, H330, H373, H411		H302, H311, H332, H373	H301, H311, H331, H373	H301, H311, H331, H373
H- and P-phrases		P260, P264, P273, P280, P284, P301+P310		P260, P301+P310, P320, P361, P405, P501	P261, P280, P301+P310, P311	P261, P280, P301+P310, P311

== Safety ==
Dinitroanilines can be explosive and flammable when exposed to heat or friction.
