= Benfluralin =

Names
- Preferred IUPAC name N-Butyl-N-ethyl-2,6-dinitro-4-(trifluoromethyl)aniline
- Other names Benefin; Benfluraline; α,α,α-Trifluoro-2,6-dinitro-N,N-ethylbutyl-p-toluidine

Identifiers
CAS Number	1861-40-1
3D model (JSmol)	Interactive image
ChEBI	CHEBI:132878
ChemSpider	2229
ECHA InfoCard	100.015.878
PubChem CID	2319
UNII	28224BUY6R
CompTox Dashboard (EPA)	DTXSID3023899
- InChI: InChI=1S/C13H16F3N3O4/c1-3-5-6-17(4-2)12-10(18(20)21)7-9(13(14,15)16)8-11(12)19(22)23/h7-8H,3-6H2,1-2H3 Key: SMDHCQAYESWHAE-UHFFFAOYSA-N; InChI=1/C13H16F3N3O4/c1-3-5-6-17(4-2)12-10(18(20)21)7-9(13(14,15)16)8-11(12)19(22)23/h7-8H,3-6H2,1-2H3 Key: SMDHCQAYESWHAE-UHFFFAOYAK
- SMILES: [O-][N+](=O)c1cc(cc([N+]([O-])=O)c1N(CCCC)CC)C(F)(F)F

Properties
Chemical formula	C_{13}H_{16}F_{3}N_{3}O_{4}
Molar mass	335.283 g·mol^{−1}
Appearance	Orange crystalline solid
Density	1.338 g/mL
Melting point	65.0 to 65.5 °C (149.0 to 149.9 °F; 338.1 to 338.6 K)
Boiling point	121 to 122 °C (250 to 252 °F; 394 to 395 K) at 0.6 mbar
Solubility in water	1 mg/L
Vapor pressure	3.7 mPa

Hazards
- Occupational safety and health (OHS/OSH)
Main hazards	Skin irritation; toxicity to aquatic life
- Lethal dose or concentration (LD, LC)
LD_{50} (median dose)	10,000 mg/kg
- Except where otherwise noted, data are given for materials in their standard state (at 25 °C [77 °F], 100 kPa). verify (what is ?) Infobox references

Benfluralin (or Benefin) is a herbicide of the dinitroaniline class. The mechanism of action of benfluralin involves pre-emergent inhibition of mitosis, root and shoot development, same as trifluralin, from which benfluralin was developed in 1963.

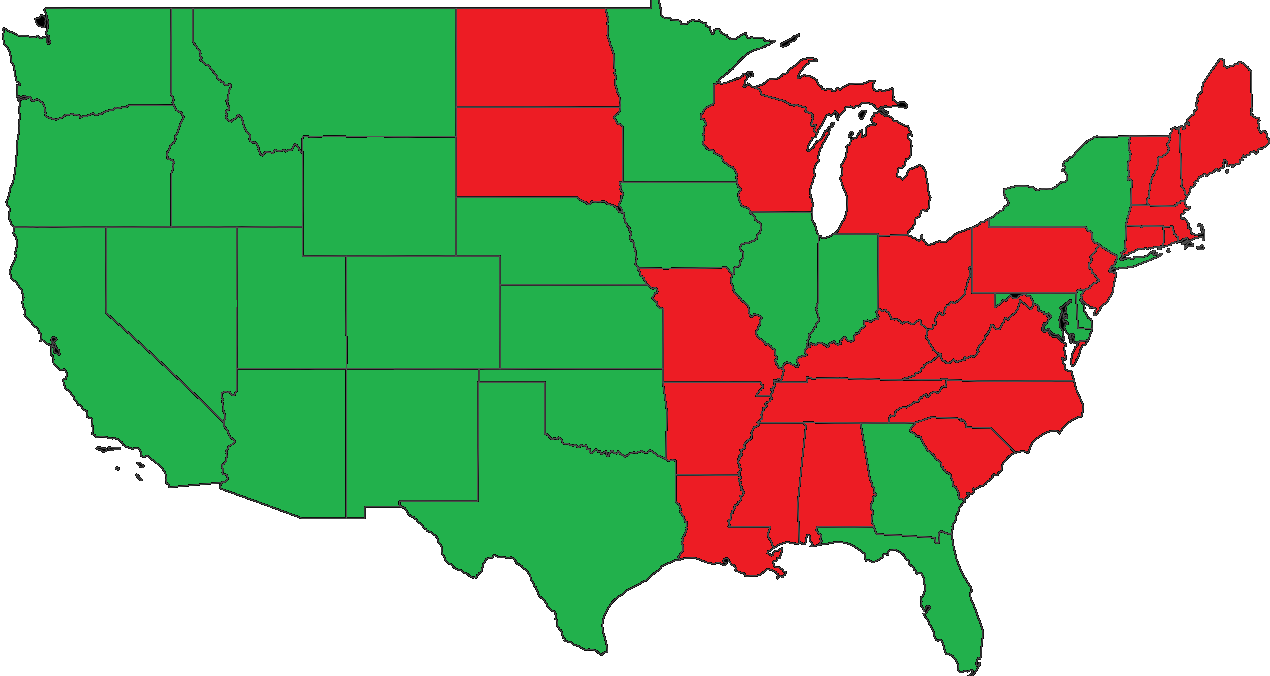
Shows states where benefin (as Balan DF) is registered (Green) or not (Red). Not shown: Hawaii, where it is registered.

It is used to control grasses and other weeds. Annual use in the United States was approximately 700,000 pounds (320 t) in 2004, down from 1,200,000 pounds (540 t) in 1974, when it was used more than paraquat. The USGS estimates 60,000 pounds (27 t) used in the US in 2018. Non-agricultural use includes domestic use, turf, golf courses, ornamentals, tree plantations, roads and paths. It is used on lettuce, alfalfa, clover, fruit, nuts, berries, and vineyards. Benfluralin's EU approval expired in 2023, leaving pendimethalin as the only EU-approved dinitroaniline.

Benfluralin (as Balan) was registered in Australia from 1967 to 1997, with 200 g/L benfluralin and 680 g/L xylene solvent.

== Environmental behaviour ==
Benfluralin's soil half-life is moderate, 22-79 days, and volatilises quickly. It can bioaccumulate in fish, to whom it is very toxic. It is practically non-toxic to birds and bees.

Vapours of benefin can affect growing tobacco leaves, and exposed leaves are shortened, narrowed, thicker and distorted. Plant height is reduced, though more leaves sprout.

== Safety ==
Benfluralin is practically non-toxic. Chronic exposure may harm the liver and kidneys. No endocrine disruption is known. EPA modelling puts benfluralin water concentrations below any level of concern, and real life evidence shows benfluralin levels to be lower than predicted.

== Herbicide application ==
Benfluralin's HRAC classification is group K1 (global), D (Aus), 3 (numeric).

After application, benefin must be inforporated into soil. It is usually applied at ~1.2 lb/ac (1.35 kg/Ha) active ingredient.

=== Tradenames ===
Benfluralin has been marketed as: Balan, Balfin, Benefex, Benfluralin, Benefin, Bethrodine, Bonalan, Carpidor, Emblem, EL-110, Flubalex, Pel-Tech, Quilan, Surflan XL 2G, Team, and XL 2G. (XL 2G tradenames also contain oryzalin.)

=== Target weeds ===
Benefin controls the following weeds: (non-exhaustive list) Grasses: Annual bluegrass (Poa annua), barnyardgrass / watergrass (Echinochloa crus-galli), crabgrass Digitaria, crowfootgrass (dactyloctenium aegyptium), foxtails / bottlegrass / bristlegrass / pigeongrass (Setaria), Johnsongrass (seedling only) (Sorghum halepense), junglerice (Echinochloa colonum), fall panicum (panicum dichotomiflorum), Texas panicum / buffalograss / coloradograss (panicum texanum) and ryegrass / sandbur (lolium multiflorum). Weeds: carpetweed (Mollugo verticillata), chickweed (stellaria media), florida pusley / purslane / mexican clover (Richardia scabra), knotweed (Polygonum aviculare), common lambsquarters (Chenopodium album), pigweeds (Amaranthus), common purslane (Portulaca oleracea) and redmaids (Calandrinia ciliata).

== Links ==
- Benfluralin in the Pesticide Properties DataBase (PPDB)
