= C12H14ClNO2 =

The molecular formula C_{12}H_{14}ClNO_{2} (molar mass: 239.69 g/mol, exact mass: 239.0713 u) may refer to:

- Clomazone
- Hydroxynorketamine (HNK), or 6-hydroxynorketamine
