= Chlornidine =

Weed control herbicide

Names
- Preferred IUPAC name N,N-Bis(2-chloroethyl)-4-methyl-2,6-dinitroaniline
- Other names N,N-(2-Chloroethyl)-2,6-dinitro-4-methylaniline

Identifiers
CAS Number	26389-78-6
3D model (JSmol)	Interactive image
ChemSpider	30910
PubChem CID	33497
UNII	734ESH36S2
CompTox Dashboard (EPA)	DTXSID8042183
- InChI: InChI=1S/C11H13Cl2N3O4/c1-8-6-9(15(17)18)11(10(7-8)16(19)20)14(4-2-12)5-3-13/h6-7H,2-5H2,1H3 Key: XKUWFOYPQIVFMM-UHFFFAOYSA-N
- SMILES: CC1=CC(=C(C(=C1)[N+](=O)[O-])N(CCCl)CCCl)[N+](=O)[O-]

Properties
Chemical formula	C_{11}H_{13}Cl_{2}N_{3}O_{4}
Molar mass	322.14 g·mol^{−1}
Melting point	42 °C (108 °F; 315 K)
Solubility in water	0.08 ppm
Solubility in ethanol	Insoluble
Vapor pressure	4.8 mPa
- Except where otherwise noted, data are given for materials in their standard state (at 25 °C [77 °F], 100 kPa). Infobox references

Chlornidine is a preemergent herbicide. It is a dinitroaniline used in China and India on soybeans, corn, cotton, sorghum, and peanuts.

It is similar to other dinitroanilines and inhibits the emergence of soybeans less than any other dinitroaniline, though it had unimpressive control of velvet-leaf and giant foxtail.

Chlornidine shares the same mode of action as other dinitroaniline herbicides such as trifluralin (see there for a detailed explanation) which involves inhibition and depolymerization of microtubule formation, effectively preventing germinating seeds' cell division.

It has been manufactured by Ansul.

Chlornidine in soil has a halflife of about 4 months, or 7 inside a greenhouse. The longer life is due to slower plant metabolism and less ventilation in the greenhouse.
