= Dinitramine =

Weed control herbicide

Names
- Preferred IUPAC name N,N-Diethyl-2,6-dinitro-4-(trifluoromethyl)benzene-1,3-diamine
- Other names: Cobex (trademark); N,N-diethyl-2,6-dinitro-4-(trifluoromethyl)-m-phenylenediamine; N,N-diethyl-2,6-dinitro-4-(trifluoromethyl)-1,3-benzenediamine

Identifiers
CAS Number	29091-05-2
3D model (JSmol)	Interactive image
ChEBI	CHEBI:81959
ChEMBL	ChEMBL1223066
ChemSpider	31718
ECHA InfoCard	100.044.912
EC Number	249-419-2
KEGG	C18785
PubChem CID	34468
UNII	XHQ6D15979
CompTox Dashboard (EPA)	DTXSID9040265
- InChI: InChI=1S/C11H13F3N4O4/c1-3-16(4-2)9-7(17(19)20)5-6(11(12,13)14)8(15)10(9)18(21)22/h5H,3-4,15H2,1-2H3 Key: OFDYMSKSGFSLLM-UHFFFAOYSA-N
- SMILES: CCN(CC)c1c(cc(c(N)c1[N+]([O-])=O)C(F)(F)F)[N+]([O-])=O

Properties
Chemical formula	C_{11}H_{13}F_{3}N_{4}O_{4}
Molar mass	322.244 g·mol^{−1}

Hazards
- GHS labelling
Pictograms	(GHS07: Exclamation mark) (GHS09: Environmental hazard)
Signal word	Warning
Hazard statements	H312, H400
Precautionary statements	P273, P280, P302+P352, P317, P321, P362+P364, P391, P501
- Lethal dose or concentration (LD, LC)
LD_{50} (median dose)	3,000 mg/kg (rat, oral); 10,000 mg/kg (mallard ducks); 1200 mg/kg (bobwhite quail)
- Except where otherwise noted, data are given for materials in their standard state (at 25 °C [77 °F], 100 kPa). Infobox references

Dinitramine is a preëmergent dinitroaniline herbicide incorporated into soil to control weeds for months after. It is no longer approved in the United States, and is not in the European Union, though in Iran it has been used to control annual grasses and broadleaf weeds in cotton and soybeans, as it was in the U.S. as of 1975, where it was also used on sunflower.

Dinitramine is chemically similar to trifluralin and other dinitroanilines, with which it shares many characteristics, such as mode of action and resistance information. In a 1977 trial, it was the only dinitroaniline to exceed trifluralin's phytotoxicity by a significant margin, on sorghum, soybeans, jimsonweed and velvetleaf, although falling short on morning glory. Trifluralin's greater popularity may be helped because toxicity to crops is usually considered bad.

Cobex (or Kobex) was a dinitramine formulation sold in the U.S. by the United States Borax & Chemical Corporation, and introduced in 1973. It was an emulsifiable concentrate of 2 pounds per gallon dinitramine (25% by weight) used on soybeans, cotton and sunflower, applied at rates of 0.25 to 0.75 pounds per acre to crops.

In 1983, test data from IBT Labs was deemed suspect by the EPA, along with several other pesticides. Rather than fund replacement studies, Cobex was withdrawn from the market.

Dinitramine's mode of action is inhibition of microtubule assembly, so its HRAC classification is Group D (Australia), Group K1 (global) or Group 3 (numeric).

== Environmental effects ==
Dinitramine's soil-halflife varies dramatically with temperature, taking 31 to 47 weeks at 10 °C, but only 3.2-2.3 weeks at 30-40 °C. In a 1977 greenhouse trial, its halflife was only 1.2 months, the least persistent of any dinitroaninile.

Dinitramine accumulates in fish's flesh at up to 20 times its water concentration, though it is metabolised with a half life under 24 hours. It is toxic to fish at concentrations of 0.590-1.52 mg/L. Zebrafish embryos suffer developmental malformations under as little as 1.6 mg/L of dinitramine exposure.

== Lists ==
Dinitramine has been marketed to control these weeds: Barnyardgrass, Florica pusley, Pigweed, Brachiaria, Foxtail species, carelessweed, carpetweed, Goosegrass, Purslane, Crabgrass, Johnsongrass, Texas panicum, Fall panicum, Smartweed, Black nightshade, Junglerice, Lambsquarters, kochia, Annual morningglory, Teaweed, Velvetleaf, Annual ragweed and hairy nightshade.

== Links ==
- Dinitramine in the Pesticide Properties DataBase (PPDB)
