= Isoxaben =

Names
- Preferred IUPAC name 2,6-Dimethoxy-N-[3-(3-methylpentan-3-yl)-1,2-oxazol-5-yl]benzamide
- Other names Benzamizole, Flexidor, Gallery, X-Pand, Prolan

Identifiers
| CAS Number | 82558-50-7 |
| 3D model (JSmol) | Interactive image |
| ChEBI | CHEBI:63956 |
| ChemSpider | 66323 |
| ECHA InfoCard | 100.100.871 |
| KEGG | C18504 |
| PubChem CID | 73672 |
| UNII | 101V41EEA4 |
| CompTox Dashboard (EPA) | DTXSID8024159 |
- InChI: InChI=1S/C18H24N2O4/c1-6-18(3,7-2)14-11-15(24-20-14)19-17(21)16-12(22-4)9-8-10-13(16)23-5/h8-11H,6-7H2,1-5H3,(H,19,21) Key: PMHURSZHKKJGBM-UHFFFAOYSA-N; InChI=1S/C18H24N2O4/c1-6-18(3,7-2)14-11-15(24-20-14)19-17(21)16-12(22-4)9-8-10-13(16)23-5/h8-11H,6-7H2,1-5H3,(H,19,21) Key: PMHURSZHKKJGBM-UHFFFAOYSA-N; InChI=1/C18H24N2O4/c1-6-18(3,7-2)14-11-15(24-20-14)19-17(21)16-12(22-4)9-8-10-13(16)23-5/h8-11H,6-7H2,1-5H3,(H,19,21) Key: PMHURSZHKKJGBM-UHFFFAOYAI
- SMILES: CCC(C)(CC)C1=NOC(=C1)NC(=O)C2=C(C=CC=C2OC)OC

Properties
| Chemical formula | C_{18}H_{24}N_{2}O_{4} |
| Molar mass | 332.400 g·mol^{−1} |
| Density | 0,58 g/cm^{3} |
| Melting point | 176 to 179 °C (349 to 354 °F; 449 to 452 K) |
- Except where otherwise noted, data are given for materials in their standard state (at 25 °C [77 °F], 100 kPa). Infobox references

Isoxaben (N-[3-(1-ethyl-1-methylpropyl)-1,2-oxazol-5-yl]-2,6-dimethoxybenzamide) is an herbicide from the benzamide and isoxazole family.

It is intended for use in vineyards and tree nut orchards for the preemergence control of broadleaf weeds.

== Trade names ==
- Gallery
- Trellis
- SureGuard (formulation of isoxaben and flumioxazin)
- Snapshot (formulation of isoxaben and trifluralin)
