= Fluchloralin =

Herbicide active ingredient

Names
- IUPAC name N-(2-chloroethyl)-2,6-dinitro-N-propyl-4-(trifluoromethyl)aniline
- Other names N-(2-chloroethyl)-2,6-dinitro-N-propyl-4-(trifluoromethyl)benzenamine

Identifiers
CAS Number	33245-39-5
3D model (JSmol)	Interactive image
ChEBI	CHEBI:81919
ChEMBL	ChEMBL1256704
ChemSpider	33448
ECHA InfoCard	100.046.736
EC Number	251-426-0
KEGG	C18730
PubChem CID	36392
UNII	98UIF19AH9
CompTox Dashboard (EPA)	DTXSID9032614
- InChI: InChI=1S/C12H13ClF3N3O4/c1-2-4-17(5-3-13)11-9(18(20)21)6-8(12(14,15)16)7-10(11)19(22)23/h6-7H,2-5H2,1H3 Key: MNFMIVVPXOGUMX-UHFFFAOYSA-N
- SMILES: CCCN(CCCl)C1=C(C=C(C=C1[N+](=O)[O-])C(F)(F)F)[N+](=O)[O-]

Properties
Chemical formula	C_{12}H_{13}ClF_{3}N_{3}O_{4}
Molar mass	355.70 g·mol^{−1}
Appearance	Yellow crystalline solid
Melting point	42 °C (108 °F; 315 K)
Solubility in water	0.9 mg/L
Vapor pressure	4.0 mPa

Hazards
- Occupational safety and health (OHS/OSH)
Main hazards	Skin and eye irritant
Flash point	30 °C (86 °F; 303 K)
- Lethal dose or concentration (LD, LC)
LD_{50} (median dose)	1550 mg/kg (rat, oral); 10000 mg/kg (dermal, rat)
- Except where otherwise noted, data are given for materials in their standard state (at 25 °C [77 °F], 100 kPa). Infobox references

Fluchloralin is a preëmergent dinitroaniline herbicide, introduced in 1972, and used to control broad-leaved weeds and annual grasses. It is used in India. In other countries, it might be considered obsolete. 71 tonnes of fluchloralin was sold in India in fiscal year 2009–2010. Basalin was registered in the US in 1975 as "Basalin", whose registration expired in 1986.

The USGS estimates fluchloralin use in the US to be 50,000 to 250,000 pounds in 1994, (22 to 112 tonnes) with no usage after 1995.

== Mechanism ==
Fluchloralin's resistance class is D (Australia), K1 (global) or 3 (numeric); its mode of action is inhibition of microtubule formation. Since it is incorporated into the top 1-2 inches of soil, germinating weeds grow up and contact fluchloralin.

Fluchloralin seems to affect cells during metaphase most. Applied to sunflower and flax, the germination rate and the plants' cells' mitotic index decreased, and the rate of chromosomal abnormality increased.

== Environmental behaviour ==
It can persist for 3 to 6 months in soil, with a half-life of 12 to 46 days, variable with temperature and soil type. In water, photolysis degrades it rapidly, with a half life of half an hour. The 24 hour LC_{50} in fish is 0.027 mg/L.

Zebrafish exposed to fluchloralin during embryogenesis showed inhibited neurogenesis in the nervous system, reduced length and dysfunction of the heart, liver and pancreas. At high concentrations, of 20 mg/L and above, fluchloralin has a genotoxic effect on human lymphocytes.

Fluchloralin is cometabolised by microörganisms in sewage, as are nitrofen, trifluralin and profluralin; i.e. enzymes from other active metabolic processes also break up these chemicals. Over 88 days, fluchloralin levels reduced by 91% under aerobic conditions. Discontinuous anaerobic conditions made little difference, with a 95% reduction. Fluchloralin had 12 identified metabolites.

== Usage ==
It has been sold as a 45% (480 g/L) emulsifiable concentrate (EC), and applied at rates of 0.75 to 1.5 kg/ha of active ingredient.

Fluchloralin can be applied up to six or eight weeks before sowing, but must be incorporated into soil (one or two inches deep) within a day of application. If treated soil is then removed, or furrowed too deeply, untreated soil can be exposed and allow weed growth.

Fluchloralin has been used on peas, beans, cotton, okra, sunflowers, soybean and peanuts.

=== List of susceptible weeds ===
It is effective on grasses and broadleaves. These grasses: smooth crabgrass (Digitaria ischaemum), large crabgrass (Digitaria sanguinalis), barnyardgrass (watergrass), giant foxtail (Setaria viridis), green foxtail (Setaria lutescens), yellow foxtail (Setaria Indica), Japanese millet (Echinochloa crus-galli var. frumentacea), junglerice (Echinochloa colonum), fall panicum (Panicum dichotomiflorum), broadleaf signalgrass (Brachiaria platyphylla), seedling johnsongrass (Sorghum halepense), Texas panicum (buffalograss, Coloradograss, Panicum texanum), shattercane (Sorghum bicolor), rhizome johnsongrass and red rice (Oryza sativa). It is effective against the broadleaf weeds: various species of pigweed (Amaranthus), lambsquarters (Chenopodium album), common purslane (Portulaca oleracea), Florida pursley (Richardia scabra) and carpetweed (Mollugo verticillata). Morningglory (Ipomoea) is also moderately susceptible.

== Tradenames ==
It has been sold as Basalin (BASF), Dhanulin (Dhanuka Agritech), Nagflur (Multiplex), Anulin (Anu), Vicolin (Ghujarat Krishi), Herbilin (Herbicide India) and Flight (Devidayal).

== Links ==
- Fluchloralin in the Pesticide Properties DataBase (PPDB)
