= Dipropalin =

Weed control herbicide

Names
- Preferred IUPAC name 4-Methyl-2,6-dinitro-N,N-dipropylaniline
- Other names: L-35355; 2,6-Dinitro-N,N-dipropyl-p-toluidine; 4-Methyl-2,6-dinitro-N,N-dipropylbenzenamine; 地乐灵 (Geleling)

Identifiers
CAS Number	1918-08-7
3D model (JSmol)	Interactive image
ChemSpider	15171
PubChem CID	15966
UNII	389074G62J
CompTox Dashboard (EPA)	DTXSID1041895
- InChI: InChI=1S/C13H19N3O4/c1-4-6-14(7-5-2)13-11(15(17)18)8-10(3)9-12(13)16(19)20/h8-9H,4-7H2,1-3H3 Key: UDVZOMAEGATTSE-UHFFFAOYSA-N
- SMILES: CCCN(CCC)C1=C(C=C(C=C1[N+](=O)[O-])C)[N+](=O)[O-]

Properties
Chemical formula	C_{13}H_{19}N_{3}O_{4}
Molar mass	281.312 g·mol^{−1}
Appearance	Yellow crystals
Melting point	42 °C (108 °F; 315 K)
Boiling point	118 °C (244 °F; 391 K)
Solubility in water	0.3 g/L

Hazards
- Lethal dose or concentration (LD, LC)
LC_{50} (median concentration)	Over 3600 mg/kg (rat, oral)
- Except where otherwise noted, data are given for materials in their standard state (at 25 °C [77 °F], 100 kPa). Infobox references

Dipropalin is a preëmergent dinitroaniline herbicide. It is currenctly not commercially used in western countries, but may be available in China and used in India. It has low acute toxicity. It is used on turf. Tests in the 1960s in the USA evaluated its performance as a trifluralin analog, where it scored the highest pre-emergent effectiveness amongst methyl-group analogs, though losing to several trifluoromethyls, such as trifluralin itself. Dipropalin's methyl group does see increased post-emergent activity, but no trifluralin analog was effective in this regard. Dipropalin is chemically identical to trifluralin, except that trifluralin's trifluoromethyl group is switched for dipropalin's methyl.

In another study, dipropalin scored better than trifluralin at controlling broadleaf weeds, but worse at grassy weeds, and much worse against sedges. Neither herbicide caused crop injury, even at 20 lb/ac. active ingredient applied, and another study found dipropalin to be much less effective against bluegrass than trifluralin, and with 80% control of crabgrass, though many tested herbicides achieved better, including trifluralin at 98%.

== Links ==
- Dipropalin in the Pesticide Properties DataBase (PPDB)
