= Butralin =

Weed control herbicide

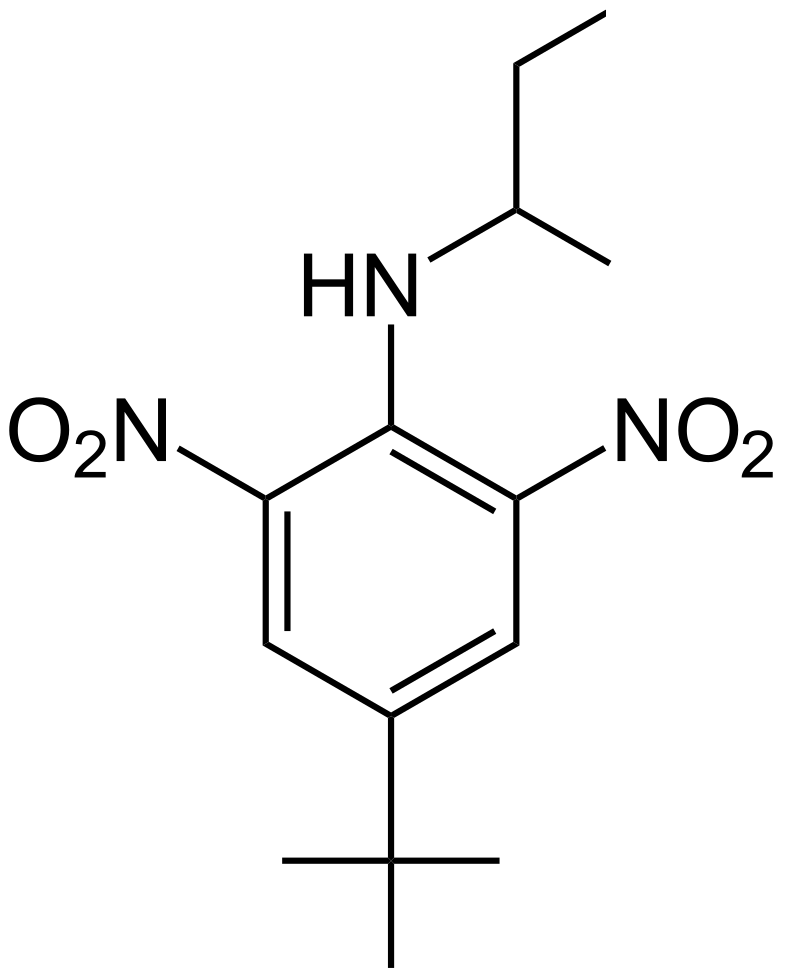

Names
- Preferred IUPAC name rac-N-[-butan-2-yl]-4-tert-butyl-2,6-dinitroaniline
- Other names: amexine; dibutaline; (RS)-N-sec-Butyl-4-tert-butyl-2,6-dinitroaniline; 4-(1,1-dimethylethyl)-N-(1-Methylpropyl)-2,6-dinitrobenzenamine

Identifiers
| CAS Number | 33629-47-9 |
| 3D model (JSmol) | Interactive image |
| ChEBI | CHEBI:81847 |
| ChEMBL | ChEMBL1256669 |
| ChemSpider | 33600 |
| ECHA InfoCard | 100.046.902 |
| EC Number | 251-607-4 |
| KEGG | C18582 |
| PubChem CID | 36565 |
| UNII | 5CZK3K1YPB |
| CompTox Dashboard (EPA) | DTXSID3032337 |
- InChI: InChI=1S/C14H21N3O4/c1-6-9(2)15-13-11(16(18)19)7-10(14(3,4)5)8-12(13)17(20)21/h7-9,15H,6H2,1-5H3 Key: SPNQRCTZKIBOAX-UHFFFAOYSA-N
- SMILES: CCC(C)NC1=C(C=C(C=C1[N+](=O)[O-])C(C)(C)C)[N+](=O)[O-]

Properties
| Chemical formula | C_{14}H_{21}N_{3}O_{4} |
| Molar mass | 295.339 g·mol^{−1} |
| Appearance | Yellow/orange powder |
| Density | 1.063 |
| Melting point | 59 °C (138 °F; 332 K) |
| Vapor pressure | 0.000013 mmHg |

Hazards
- GHS labelling
| Pictograms | (GHS07: Exclamation mark) (GHS08: Health hazard) (GHS09: Environmental hazard) |
| Signal word | Warning |
| Hazard statements | H302, H319, H341, H361, H410 |
| Precautionary statements | P203, P264, P264+P265, P270, P273, P280, P301+P317, P305+P351+P338, P318, P330, P337+P317, P391, P405, P501 |
| Flash point | 36 °C (97 °F; 309 K) |
- Lethal dose or concentration (LD, LC)
| LD_{50} (median dose) | 1100 mg/kg (rat, oral); >2000 mg/kg (rat, dermal); 2250 mg/kg (bobwhite quail, oral) |
| LC_{50} (median concentration) | 0.37 mg/L (rainbow trout); 0.12 mg/L (algae) |
- Except where otherwise noted, data are given for materials in their standard state (at 25 °C [77 °F], 100 kPa). Infobox references

Butralin is a preemergent herbicide used to control suckers on tobacco in the United States, Australia, Mozambique and, for food crops also, China. It is a dinitroaniline, first registered in the US in 1976. It was used in the EU until a ban in 2009 due to its ecotoxicity.

== Mode of action and effects ==
Butralin works by the HRAC mode of action Group D / K1 / 3, (Australian, Global, Numeric respectively), which involves inhibition of microtubule formation, by binding to tubulin, halting growth, and causing depolymerization.

In ryegrass meristems, butralin-treated roots show reduced elongation, but greater diameter. The cells' rate of mitosis lowers 36% after one hour, and they develop multiple nuclei. Butralin's effect is more similar to carbamate herbicides such as chlorpropham rather than other dinitroanilines.

== Usage ==
Butralin is sold in Mozambique as "Tobralin 36% EC", made in South Africa. Users are instructed to pour 10 mL on each tobacco plant by hand, and not to unclog nozzles with their mouths.

In China, over 100 tons per year are used, as of 2022, on garlic, soybean, tomato, rice, peanut, pepper, cotton, eggplant, and watermelon. The maximum residue limit is 0.02 to 0.1 mg/kg. The growing Chinese market sells it in 36% or 48% emulsifiable concentrates, and in development as of 2012, a 41% wettable powder. The powder claims to be environmentally friendly, as it lacks the volatile organic molecules such as toluene and xylene used as solvent in EC formulations. The powder is recommended to be applied at 2100 g/Ha (active ingredient).

In Australia, butralin was registered in 1996. Butralin as an active ingredient is still registered, though no product containing it has been registered since 2008. It may have been registered before 1990.

American usage (by USGS estimates) has held roughly steady at about 40,000 pounds (18 t) per year (data from 1996 to 2018).

== Health ==
Butralin is of low acute toxicity. There is no association with lung cancer.

It is very toxic to plankton of the genus Daphnia.

== In soil ==
Butralin is likely to be moderately persistent to persistent and relatively immobile in terrestrial environments. Butralin is stable to abiotic hydrolysis and photodegradation on soil. Its characteristics are unlike those of chemicals that leach to groundwater. Butralin's major soil metabolite is 4-tert-butyl-2,6-dinitroaniline. Other major metabolites see the loss of more or all of the carbons and hydrogen over the nitrogen, or loss of oxygen from the nitro groups. The principle residue in crops, however, is the parent butralin.

== Links ==
- Butralin in the Pesticide Properties DataBase (PPDB)
