= Methalpropalin =

Names
- Preferred IUPAC name N-(2-Methylprop-2-enyl)-2,6-dinitro-N-propyl-4-(trifluoromethyl)aniline
- Other names: α,α,α-trifluoro-N-(2-methylallyl)-2,6-dinitro-N-propyl-p-toluidine; N-(2-methyl-2-propen-1-yl)-2,6-dinitro-N-propyl-4-(trifluoromethyl)benzenamine

Identifiers
CAS Number	57801-46-4
3D model (JSmol)	Interactive image
ChemSpider	13417807
PubChem CID	18430308
UNII	0YA9239SJ6
CompTox Dashboard (EPA)	DTXSID60206501
- InChI: InChI=1S/C14H16F3N3O4/c1-4-5-18(8-9(2)3)13-11(19(21)22)6-10(14(15,16)17)7-12(13)20(23)24/h6-7H,2,4-5,8H2,1,3H3 Key: DRWWMFAZIDKURY-UHFFFAOYSA-N
- SMILES: CCCN(CC(=C)C)C1=C(C=C(C=C1[N+](=O)[O-])C(F)(F)F)[N+](=O)[O-]

Properties
Chemical formula	C_{14}H_{16}F_{3}N_{3}O_{4}
Molar mass	347.294 g·mol^{−1}
Density	1.325 t/m^{3} (predicted)
Boiling point	383 °C (721 °F; 656 K) Predicted
- Except where otherwise noted, data are given for materials in their standard state (at 25 °C [77 °F], 100 kPa). Infobox references

Methalpropalin is a dinitroaniline herbicide used to control broad-leaf weeds.

Research samples of methalpropalin have been formulated prior to 1977 by Lilly Research Laboratories.

Methalpropalin's mode of action is to disrupt microtubule formation; this makes its HRAC classification Group D (Australia), Group K1 (global) and Group 3 (numeric).

Little study has been done on methalpropalin.

== See also ==
- Ethalfluralin, a closely related herbicide
