= Isopropalin =

Weed control herbicide

Names
- Preferred IUPAC name 4-Isopropyl-2,6-dinitro-N,N-dipropylaniline
- Other names: Paarlan; EL-179 (development code)

Identifiers
| CAS Number | 33820-53-0 |
| 3D model (JSmol) | Interactive image |
| ChEBI | CHEBI:82189 |
| ChEMBL | ChEMBL1256728 |
| ChemSpider | 33636 |
| ECHA InfoCard | 100.046.977 |
| EC Number | 251-690-7 |
| KEGG | C19063 |
| PubChem CID | 36606 |
| UNII | 52GZD1I41N |
| CompTox Dashboard (EPA) | DTXSID8024157 |
- InChI: InChI=1S/C15H23N3O4/c1-5-7-16(8-6-2)15-13(17(19)20)9-12(11(3)4)10-14(15)18(21)22/h9-11H,5-8H2,1-4H3 Key: NEKOXWSIMFDGMA-UHFFFAOYSA-N
- SMILES: CCCN(CCC)C1=C(C=C(C=C1[N+](=O)[O-])C(C)C)[N+](=O)[O-]

Properties
| Chemical formula | C_{15}H_{23}N_{3}O_{4} |
| Molar mass | 309.366 g·mol^{−1} |
| Appearance | Orange liquid |
| Solubility in water | 0.11ppm |
| Vapor pressure | 30 × 10^{−6} mm Hg (30°C) |

Hazards
- Occupational safety and health (OHS/OSH)
| Main hazards | Toxic to fish |
- GHS labelling
| Pictograms | (GHS05: Corrosive) (GHS09: Environmental hazard) |
| Signal word | Warning |
| Hazard statements | H226, H410 |
| Precautionary statements | P210, P233, P240, P241, P242, P243, P273, P280, P303+P361+P353, P370+P378, P391, P403+P235, P501 |
- Lethal dose or concentration (LD, LC)
| LD_{50} (median dose) | >5000mg/kg (oral, rats); >2000mg/kg (dog/rabbit) |
- Except where otherwise noted, data are given for materials in their standard state (at 25 °C [77 °F], 100 kPa). Infobox references

Isopropalin is a herbicide. Invented in 1969, it is a preëmergent selective dinitroaniline to control annual grasses and broadleaf weeds. Brought by DowElanco in 1972 to the US and Australia, it is now considered obsolete. In 1974, American farmers used 250,000 pounds (110,000 kg) of isopropalin.

== Paarlan ==
Paarlan was a 69% isopropalin emulsifiable concentrate approved for use on tobacco. It required soil incorporation due to low solubility, ultraviolet light degradation and high volatilisation, and it may have been registered for white potatoes and tomatoes. Dow marketed Paarlan to southern culture, with a video advert claiming it "is just as much a part of tobacco country as ham and biscuits are part of breakfast."

Paarlan was applied at 1-2 kg/Ha (active ingredient).

== Safety ==
Rats fed diets with large amounts of isopropalin had reduced hemoglobin concentrations, lowered hematocrits, and altered organ weights at the higher doses tested. It is slightly irritating to skin and eyes. Its NOEL on dogs is over 250 mg/kg dietary.

== Environmental behaviour ==
Isopropalin is the most persistent dinitroaniline herbicide in soil, with a field halflife of nearly 10 months, though only 6 months in the greenhouse test. It is one of the least phytotoxic to sorghum, though in weed-control tests had roughly middle of the pack phytotoxicity to weeds.

Isopropalin is not toxic to chickens, mallard ducks, (LD50 >2000 mg/kg) or quail (>1000 mg/kg). The LC50 for goldfish is >0.15 mg/L, for minnows, >0.1 mg/L.

It does not translocate, in plants, to the leaves or fruit, and no significatn residues or metabolites have been detected. Isopropalin is strongly absorbed in soil, with minimal leaching, and a soil half-life of under 6 months. The loss in soil is possibly from microörgamisms, volatilisation and photolysis of ispropalin on the surface.

== Chemical properties ==
Isopropalin is only one part in a million soluble in water, but dissolves readily, to more than 1000 g/L, in acetone, hexane, benzene, chloroform, diethyl ether, acetonitrile and methanol. It is stable in field use, but decomposes in laboratory under UV light.

== Links ==
- Isopropalin in the Pesticide Properties DataBase (PPDB)
