= Ethalfluralin =

Weed control herbicide

Names
- Preferred IUPAC name N-Ethyl-α,α,α-trifluoro-N-(2-methylallyl)-2,6-dinitro-p-toluidine

Identifiers
CAS Number	55283-68-6
3D model (JSmol)	Interactive image
ChEBI	CHEBI:81988
ChEMBL	ChEMBL1256703
ChemSpider	37761
ECHA InfoCard	100.054.131
EC Number	259-564-3
KEGG	C18827
PubChem CID	41381
UNII	51DKA727XQ
UN number	UN3077
CompTox Dashboard (EPA)	DTXSID8032386
- InChI: InChI=1S/C13H14F3N3O4/c1-4-17(7-8(2)3)12-10(18(20)21)5-9(13(14,15)16)6-11(12)19(22)23/h5-6H,2,4,7H2,1,3H3 Key: PTFJIKYUEPWBMS-UHFFFAOYSA-N
- SMILES: CCN(CC(=C)C)C1=C(C=C(C=C1[N+](=O)[O-])C(F)(F)F)[N+](=O)[O-]

Properties
Chemical formula	C_{13}H_{14}F_{3}N_{3}O_{4}
Molar mass	333.267 g·mol^{−1}
Appearance	Yellow to orange crystals
Odor	Faint amine odour
Melting point	57 °C (135 °F; 330 K)
Boiling point	256 °C (493 °F; 529 K)
Solubility in water	0.3 mg/L
Solubility in Acetone	>500 g/L
Solubility in Benzene	>500 g/L
Solubility in Acetonitrile	>500 g/L
Solubility in Xylene	>500 g/L
Vapor pressure	11.5 mPa

Hazards
- Occupational safety and health (OHS/OSH)
Main hazards	Skin and eye irritant; toxic to aquatic life
- GHS labelling
Pictograms	(GHS07: Exclamation mark) (GHS08: Health hazard) (GHS09: Environmental hazard)
Signal word	Warning
Hazard statements	H315, H317, H319, H332, H351, H400, H411
Precautionary statements	P203, P261, P264, P264+P265, P271, P272, P273, P280, P302+P352, P304+P340, P305+P351+P338, P317, P318, P321, P333+P317, P337+P317, P362+P364, P391, P405, P501
Flash point	151 °C (304 °F; 424 K)
- Lethal dose or concentration (LD, LC)
LD_{50} (median dose)	>5000 mg/kg (oral, rat, or rabbit, dermal)
LC_{50} (median concentration)	0.136 mg/L (trout)
- Except where otherwise noted, data are given for materials in their standard state (at 25 °C [77 °F], 100 kPa). Infobox references

Ethalfluralin is a herbicide. It is a preëmergent dinitroaniline developed from trifluralin, used to control annual grasses and broad-leaved weeds. It was synthesised in 1971, first sold in Turkey in 1975, the United States in 1983. It is used on soybeans, peanuts, potatoes, and as of 2023, is the first conventional herbicide the EPA permits on hemp, as ethalfluralin leaves no residue in the plant. Ethalfluralin is not approved for household use in the US.

In 2024, ethalfluralin was registered in India.

== Mechanism of action ==
Ethalfluralin works by inhibition of microtubule formation, preventing cell division, and is a Group D / Group K1 / Group 3 herbicide (Australian, Global and numeric HRAC respectively). It is applied at approximately 1 kg/Ha.

== Health effects ==
Ethalfluralin is of low toxicity, with a median lethal dose needed of over 5000 mg/kg, which is less toxic than table salt (3000 mg/kg).

Ethalfluralin is practically non-toxic to birds and mammals, though it causes moderate eye and skin irritation, and skin sensitisation. Subchronic rat and mice studies saw effects to the liver and kidneys, reduced weight gain, and affected enzyme activity. The EPA regards ethalfluralin as a possible carcinogen, due to tumours in chronically exposed rats. Ethalfluralin did not affect the reproductive system or cause strong mutagenisis.

Dietary effect is unlikely as ethalfluralin does not leave residues in plants and doesn't translocate.

== Environment ==
Ethalfluralin did not leach in soil, and the EPA expects it not to contaminate ground water, though it notes the chemically very similar trifluralin has been found in groundwater. Ethalfluralin is very toxic to fish.

In tests, ethalfluralin disrupts zebrafish embryo development, decreasing survival rate, causing fluid retention in the heart and yolk sac, and apoptosis in larvae; possibly by inducing oxidative stress.

== Tradenames ==
Ethalfluralin has been sold as Gilan, Sonalan, Curbit, Sonalen and Edge.
