= Profluralin =

Names
- Preferred IUPAC name (N-(Cyclopropylmethyl)-2,6-dinitro-N-propyl-4-(trifluoromethyl)aniline
- Other names N-(Cyclopropylmethyl)-α,α,α-trifluoro-2,6-dinitro-N-propyl-p-toluidine; N-(Cyclopropylmethyl)-2,6-dinitro-N-propyl-4-(trifluoromethyl)-benzenamine

Identifiers
CAS Number	26399-36-0
3D model (JSmol)	Interactive image
ChEBI	CHEBI:82191
ChEMBL	ChEMBL1256764
ChemSpider	30913
ECHA InfoCard	100.043.309
EC Number	247-656-6
KEGG	C19065
PubChem CID	33500
UNII	36W2L722UX
CompTox Dashboard (EPA)	DTXSID2044559
- InChI: InChI=1S/C14H16F3N3O4/c1-2-5-18(8-9-3-4-9)13-11(19(21)22)6-10(14(15,16)17)7-12(13)20(23)24/h6-7,9H,2-5,8H2,1H3 Key: ITVQAKZNYJEWKS-UHFFFAOYSA-N
- SMILES: CCCN(CC1CC1)C2=C(C=C(C=C2[N+](=O)[O-])C(F)(F)F)[N+](=O)[O-]

Properties
Chemical formula	C_{14}H_{16}F_{3}N_{3}O_{4}
Molar mass	347.294 g·mol^{−1}
Appearance	Yellow/Orange Solid
Density	1380 kg/m^{3}
Melting point	32 °C (90 °F; 305 K)
Solubility in water	0.1 ppm
Vapor pressure	8.4 mPa

Hazards
- GHS labelling
Pictograms	(GHS07: Exclamation mark) (GHS09: Environmental hazard)
Signal word	Warning
Hazard statements	H318, H410
Precautionary statements	P264, P273
- Lethal dose or concentration (LD, LC)
LD_{50} (median dose)	10000 mg/kg (rat, oral)
- Except where otherwise noted, data are given for materials in their standard state (at 25 °C [77 °F], 100 kPa). Infobox references

Profluralin is a dinitroaniline herbicide used preëmergently to control annual grasses and broadleaf weeds, in cotton, soybeans, peanuts, sunflower, cabbage, cauliflower, tomato and others. Profluralin has largely fallen out of use. It rose out of the related, still in common use, trifluralin. It was commercialised in the 1970s.

== Commercialisation ==
Profluralin, first reported in 1973, was introduced by Ciba-Geigy and patented.

It was sold under the tradenames "Pregard" and "Tolban" (Ciba-Geigy), registered in August 1975 and expiring in April 1984. Tolban was a 45% profluralin emulsifiable concentrate. 48,000 pounds (22 t) was used in the US in 1974. The USGS estimates that 5 to 65 thousand pounds (2.3 to 29.5 t) was used in 1994, with no usage after.

As of 2012, Pregard and Tolban are discontinued.

== Mode of action ==
Profluralin's mode of action is by binding to tubulin microtubules as they form, blocking further growth. It shares the same mechanism and resistance properties of trifluralin, and other dinitroanlines. This makes it a Group 3 herbicide by HRAC classification. (AKA Australian Group D and global Group K1)

It is absorbed through roots and shoots, applied at 0.75-1.5 kg/Ha (active ingredient), formulated as an emulsifiable concentrate.

== Environmental behaviour ==
Environmental decomposition by microörganisms happens in soil and water. Typical soil half-lives for profluralin are 80-160 days. Profluralin is adsorbed into plantmatter, so there is potential that it stay in crops after harvest. It is practically non-toxic to birds and mammals, though bees and fish are affected. If applied in high doses to rats, they may exhibit ataxia, slower breathing, salivation, prostration, hyperactivity or dyspnea. It interacts with dsDNA via electrostatic binding. There is no significant leaching through soil.

Microörganisms in sewage cometabolise profluralin, trifluralin, fluchloralin and nitrofen; i.e. enzymes from other active metabolic processes also break up these chemicals. Over 88 days, profluralin levels reduced by 87% under aerobic conditions, into 9 metabolite products. Discontinuous anaerobic conditions slowed the process to a 23% reduction in the same time, with 5 metabolites.

== Safety ==
Profluralin is not toxic, not considered a carcinogen. Human harm is not expected, outside of eye irritation. Profluralin is very toxic to fish though, and is theorised to bioaccumulate in them. It is non-irritating to skin, though moderately so on eyes.

== Chemical properties ==
Pure profluralin is soluble in most organic solvents, e.g. n-octanol (220 g/L), or in ethanol, acetone, xylene and n-hexane. When made, it is chemically stable for at least three years. It decomposes under UV light, or at temperatures over 180°C (356°F), though solutions slowly hydrolyse at about 100°C (212°F) with a half-life of 6 hours, at pH 3-10.

== Links ==
- Profluralin in the Pesticide Properties DataBase (PPDB)
