= Triaminobenzene =

Triaminobenzene may refer to any of three isomeric organic compounds. All three isomers are colorless, oxygen-sensitive solids. They are typically prepared by hydrogenation of the trinitrobenzene or dinitroaniline derivatives.

Selected identifiers and properties.
name	RN	PubChem CID	melting point (°C)
1,2,3-Triaminobenzene	608-32-2	CID 69099 from PubChem	103
1,2,4-Triaminobenzene	615-71-4	CID 69206 from PubChem	97.3
1,3,5-Triaminobenzene	108-72-5	CID 66952 from PubChem	108-112
