= Cyanomethine =

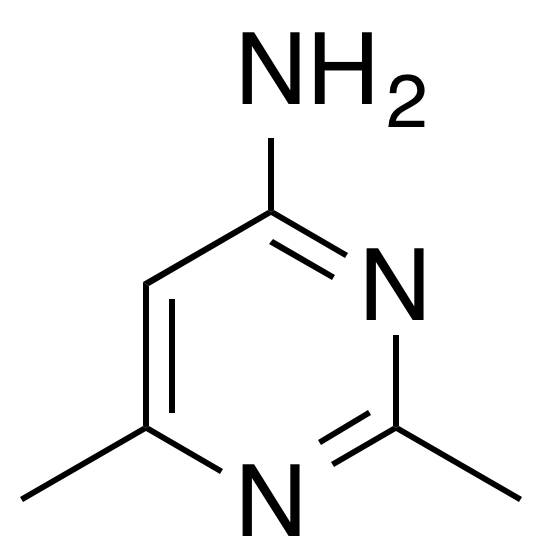

Names
- IUPAC name 4-Amino-2,6-dimethylpyrimidine
- Other names: Cyanmethine; Kyanmethin; 6-Amino-2,4-dimethylpyrimidine; 2,6-Dimethyl-4-pyrimidinamine; 2,6-Dimethylpyrimidin-4-ylamine; Trimethyl cyanuride; Amidodimethylmetadiazine

Identifiers
CAS Number	461-98-3
3D model (JSmol)	Interactive image
ChemSpider	61354
ECHA InfoCard	100.006.656
EC Number	207-320-1
PubChem CID	68039
UNII	3MM3JQH7MX
CompTox Dashboard (EPA)	DTXSID50196725
- InChI: InChI=1S/C6H9N3/c1-4-3-6(7)9-5(2)8-4/h3H,1-2H3,(H2,7,8,9) Key: BJJDXAFKCKSLTE-UHFFFAOYSA-N
- SMILES: CC1=CC(=NC(=N1)C)N

Properties
Chemical formula	C_{6}H_{9}N_{3}
Molar mass	123.159 g·mol^{−1}
Appearance	crystalline solid
Odor	irritating
Melting point	180–185 °C (356–365 °F; 453–458 K)
Solubility in water	soluble

Hazards
- GHS labelling
Pictograms	(GHS07: Exclamation mark)
Signal word	Warning
Hazard statements	H315, H319, H335
Precautionary statements	P261, P264, P264+P265, P271, P280, P302+P352, P304+P340, P305+P351+P338, P319, P321, P332+P317, P337+P317, P362+P364, P403+P233, P405, P501
- Except where otherwise noted, data are given for materials in their standard state (at 25 °C [77 °F], 100 kPa). Infobox references

Cyanomethine (4-amino-2,6-dimethylpyrimidine) is an amino and methylated derivative of pyrimidine with the chemical formula C_{6}H_{9}N_{3}, belonging to a class named cyanalkines.

== Properties ==
Cyanomethine is a strongly basic colourless to white crystalline solid. It is soluble in water and slightly soluble in alcohol.

Cyanomethine can form complexes with platinum(II) and platinum(IV) compounds.

== Synthesis ==
Cyanomethine is prepared by the trimerisation of acetonitrile with sodium or potassium, with the corresponding metal cyanide and C_{4}H_{6}N_{2} (possibly 2-methylimidazole or 3-methylpyrazole; iminoacetonitrile has been identified) as the main byproducts. It can also made by reaction of sodium methoxide and acetonitrile.

The correspondence of the three acetonitrile units to a tautomer of cyanomethine is:

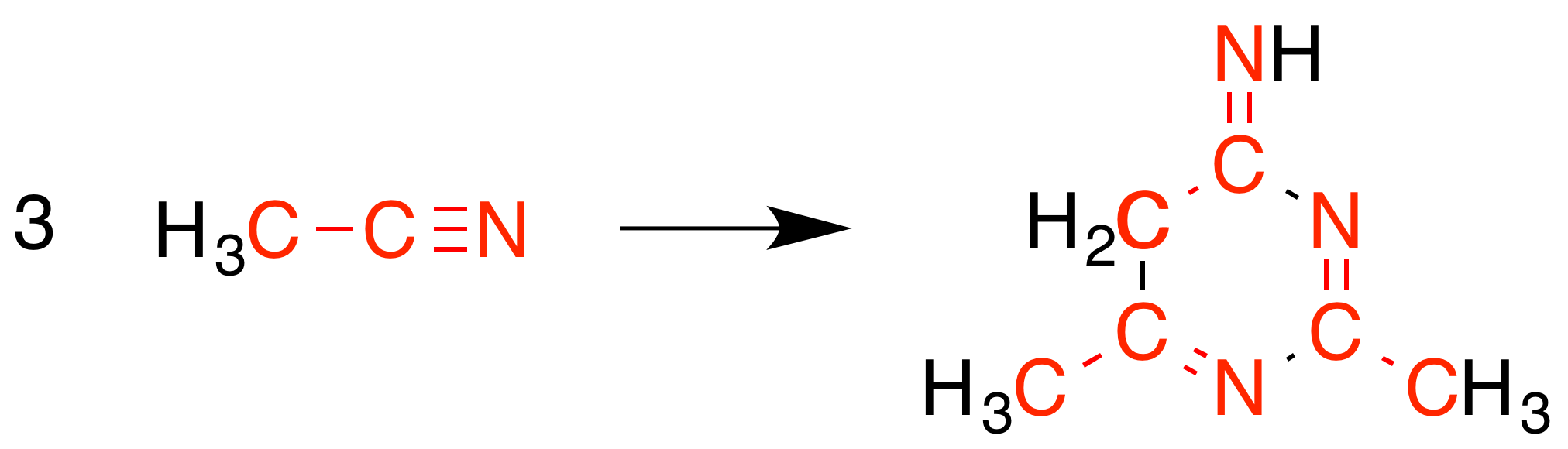

At higher pressure, sodium methoxide instead catalyzes trimerization to form 2,4,6-Trimethyl-1,3,5-triazine.

2,6-Diethyl-5-methyl-4-pyrimidinamine (cyan(o)ethine) is an analogous structure that can be made by trimerization of propionitrile.
