= IDPN (chemical) =

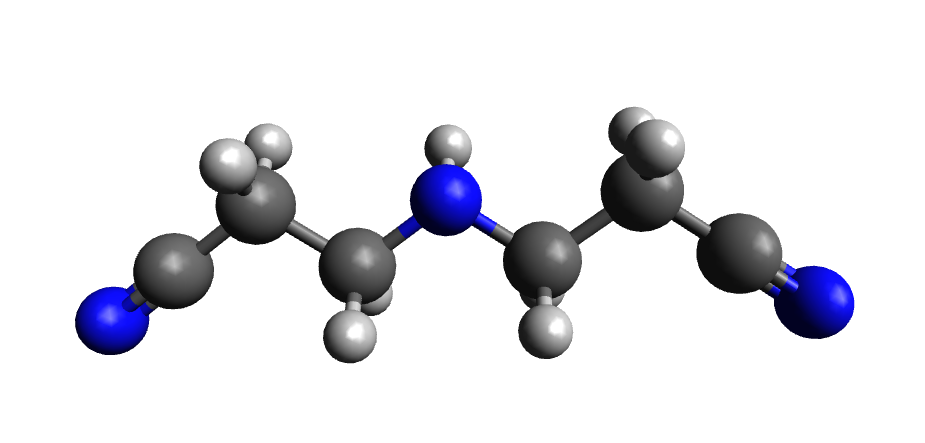

Names
- Preferred IUPAC name 3,3′-Azanediyldipropanenitrile
- Other names Bis(2-cyanoethyl)amine β,β-iminodipropanenitrile

Identifiers
CAS Number	111-94-4
3D model (JSmol)	Interactive image
ChEBI	CHEBI:231607
ChemSpider	7857
ECHA InfoCard	100.003.566
EC Number	203-922-3
PubChem CID	8149
UNII	3XP1CVU865
UN number	3334
CompTox Dashboard (EPA)	DTXSID2041464
- InChI: InChI=1S/C6H9N3/c7-3-1-5-9-6-2-4-8/h9H,1-2,5-6H2 Key: SBAJRGRUGUQKAF-UHFFFAOYSA-N
- SMILES: C(CNCCC#N)C#N

Properties
Chemical formula	C_{6}H_{9}N_{3}
Molar mass	123.159 g·mol^{−1}
Appearance	Clear and colourless liquid
Density	1.02
Melting point	−5.5 °C (22.1 °F; 267.6 K)
Boiling point	173 °C (343 °F; 446 K) at 10 mmHg
Solubility in water	≥100 mg/mL
Solubility	Miscible in ethanol, acetone, benzene
log P	-1.34
Vapor pressure	0.00361 mmHg (25 °C); 1 mmHg (140 °C)
Acidity (pK_{a})	5.26 (H_{2}O)

Hazards
- GHS labelling
Pictograms	(GHS07: Exclamation mark)
Signal word	Warning
Hazard statements	H227, H303, H313, H315, H319, H335
Precautionary statements	P210, P261, P264, P270, P271, P280, P302+P352, P304+P340, P305+P351+P338, P312, P321, P332+P313, P337+P313, P362+P364, P370+P378, P403+P233, P405, P501
Flash point	110 °C (230 °F; 383 K)
- Lethal dose or concentration (LD, LC)
LD_{50} (median dose)	2700 mg/kg (rat, oral); 2520 mg/kg (rabbit, dermal)
- Except where otherwise noted, data are given for materials in their standard state (at 25 °C [77 °F], 100 kPa). Infobox references

IDPN (3,3'-iminodipropanenitrile) is a synthetic nitrile compound that acts as a neurotoxin with ototoxic and hepatotoxic effects. It causes irreversible movement disorder.

== History ==
IDPN is a synthetic nitrile, which was firstly synthesized among other amino nitriles in 1934. In the mid-20^{th} century IDPN was described as a chemical that caused rodents to develop a permanent neurological syndrome. This syndrome was characterized by abnormal movement and balance deficits. Subsequent studies showed that IDPN produces degeneration of vestibular hair cells.

During the late 20^{th} century, IDPN became a widely used experimental vestibular toxin in neurotoxicology. The compound was used to study hair-cell degeneration, central nervous system damage, and the behavioral consequences of vestibular dysfunction. These results showed that the degeneration of vestibular sensory cells and the changes in motor behavior are dose dependent.

IDPN is now used in laboratory studies as a model for inner-ear injury and movement disorders. This helps researchers to investigate how vestibular damage influences balance, sensory processing, and neuroplasticity.

== Structure and Reactivity ==
IDPN is an aliphatic aminonitrile, specifically a secondary aminonitrile consisting of two β-cyanoethyl groups bound to a central nitrogen atom. Nitrile groups are commonly robust groups that are not metabolised unless activated by adjecent groups.The nitrile groups can act as hydrogen bond acceptors meaning that it can form hydrogen bonds with water or hydrogen bond donating amino acid residues such as serine and arganine.

== Synthesis ==
IDPN is commonly synthesised through two successive cyanoethylations of ammonia with acrylonitrile under basic conditions. In the first step, ammonia undergoes a Michael addition to acrylonitrile to form β-aminonitrile.

$\ce{NH3 + CH2=CH-CN->NH2-CH2-CH2-CN}$

In the second step, the reaction intermediate again undergoes a Michael addition with acrylonitrile to form β,β-iminodipropanenitrile.

$\ce{NH2-CH2-CH2-CN + CH2=CH-CN->NC-CH2-CH2-NH-CH2-CH2-CN}$

== Mechanism of action ==
The exact molecular mechanism of IDPN is unknown. However, there has been hypothesises that the molecule interacts with neurofilaments and gives a direct covalent modification or the production of free radicals. What is known is that IDPN selectively disrupts the low anterograde transport and initiates a disorganization of the cytoskeleton. The disorganization causes the neurofilaments to dissociate from microtubules, the neurofilaments then segregate towards the perimeter of the axonal cross section and the microtubules move to the interior core. IDPN's neurotoxicity mainly affects neurons containing 5-hydroxytriptamine.

=== Treatment ===
While there are no proper treatments for the effects of IDPN, there has been some compounds that provide protection or relieve from the symptoms. Selenium is able to reduce the intensity of retrocollis, laterocollis, circling, and backwalking in a dose-dependent manner in animals treated with 5 – 10 μmol/kg body weight in selenium. For animals treated with 20 μmol/kg body weight in selenium, the symptoms were completely absent. Cysteamine is another compound that, when administered at the same time as the IDPN in doses of 25 – 100 mg/kg , protects against IDPN induced dyskinetic syndrome.

== Metabolism ==
In rats, IDPN is metabolised inside the liver into several different metabolites. The compound is first oxidised at one of the β-carbons and then further hydrolysed, cleaving the amide bond to form β-aminopropionitrile and cyanoacetic acid. β-aminopropionitrile is then further metabolised to β-alanine, which is the major metabolic product from IDPN. All three major metabolites do not show major toxicity, showing that the intact IDPN or an activated form is the reactive species.

== Availability and use ==
=== Usage ===
IDPN is mostly used as a neurotoxin in biomedical research, particularly in research of the structure and function of axons, the inner ear, and movement disorders.Additionally, it is used in toxicological research, to investigate the mechanisms of axon diseases and cytoskeletal disruptions in neurons. Lastly IDPN has been applied to developmental neurotoxicity research, where it is used to examine brain development, and motor behavior.

==== IDPN as a model for Tourette syndrome ====
Chronic treatment of rodents with IDPN produces a dyskinetic syndrome characterized by hyperactivity, hyperexcitability, and abnormal neck movements, including lateral (laterocollis) and vertical (retrocollis) dyskinesias. Additional behavioral abnormalities include random circling and backward locomotion. This constellation of symptoms has been termed Excitation, Circling, and Chorea (ECC) syndrome. IDPN has also been reported to induce species-specific behavioral disturbances in other animals. In birds, exposure leads to excessive courtship behavior, hyperactivity, and compulsive feeding, while in fish it causes abnormal movements such as barrel rolling, swimming on the side or back, and standing on the head.

The behavioral effects are persistent and resemble those produced by acute systemic administration of dopamine (DA) and serotonin (5-HT). Because several of these manifestations resemble dyskinesia syndromes such as Tourette syndrome (TS), IDPN administration in rodents has been used as an experimental model for TS. Validation of this model is based on similarities in behavioral symptoms as well as reported decreases in STX1A expression and alterations in dopamine and serotonin levels. However, the model has limitations, including the systemic toxicity of IDPN and its inability to reproduce the full symptomatic heterogeneity observed in individuals with tic disorders, such as facial tics and associated cognitive or emotional disturbances.

=== Availability ===
IDPN is only available for laboratory and research purposes, it is mostly available through specialized chemical suppliers .

== Adverse effects and Toxicology ==
=== Adverse effects ===
==== Ototoxicity ====
IDPN has been shown to kill vestibular hair cells, disrupting normal vestibular function, in rats, mice, guinea pigs, and frogs. In rodents, the loss of vestibular function results in balance-related deficits, including circling behavior, retropulsion, and head bobbing, as well as weight loss. Type I hair cells are more sensitive to IDPN toxicity than Type II hair cells. No regeneration of vestibular hair cells was observed, thus these effects can be considered to be irreversible.

IDPN has also been shown to kill cochlear hair cells, affecting auditory function. IDPN-induced hearing loss covered a broad range of frequencies. The change in behaviour in rats after exposure to IDPN is caused by vestibular toxicity and hair cell loss.

Next to the known symptoms of IDPN, such as axonopathy and vestibular hair-cell degeneration. IDPN can also induce liver and kidney toxicities, as well as weight-loss, and hyperactivity.

=== Toxicology ===
The median lethal dose (LD50) of IDPN was determined to be 2700 mg/kg via oral administration in rats, 200 mg/kg through intraperitoneal injection in mice, and 2520 mg/kg when applied to the skin of rabbits. The effects of excitation and agitation caused by IDPN were observed at injection levels of 4 mg/kg/day in rats following a duration of 5-10 days. The loss of vestibular hair cells in rats becomes apparent after a 400 mg/kg intraperitoneal injection, with nearly all hair cells being lost at 600 mg/kg and complete loss at 1000 mg/kg .LD50 Rat oral 2700 mg/kg.
