= 2,4-Dinitrochlorobenzene =

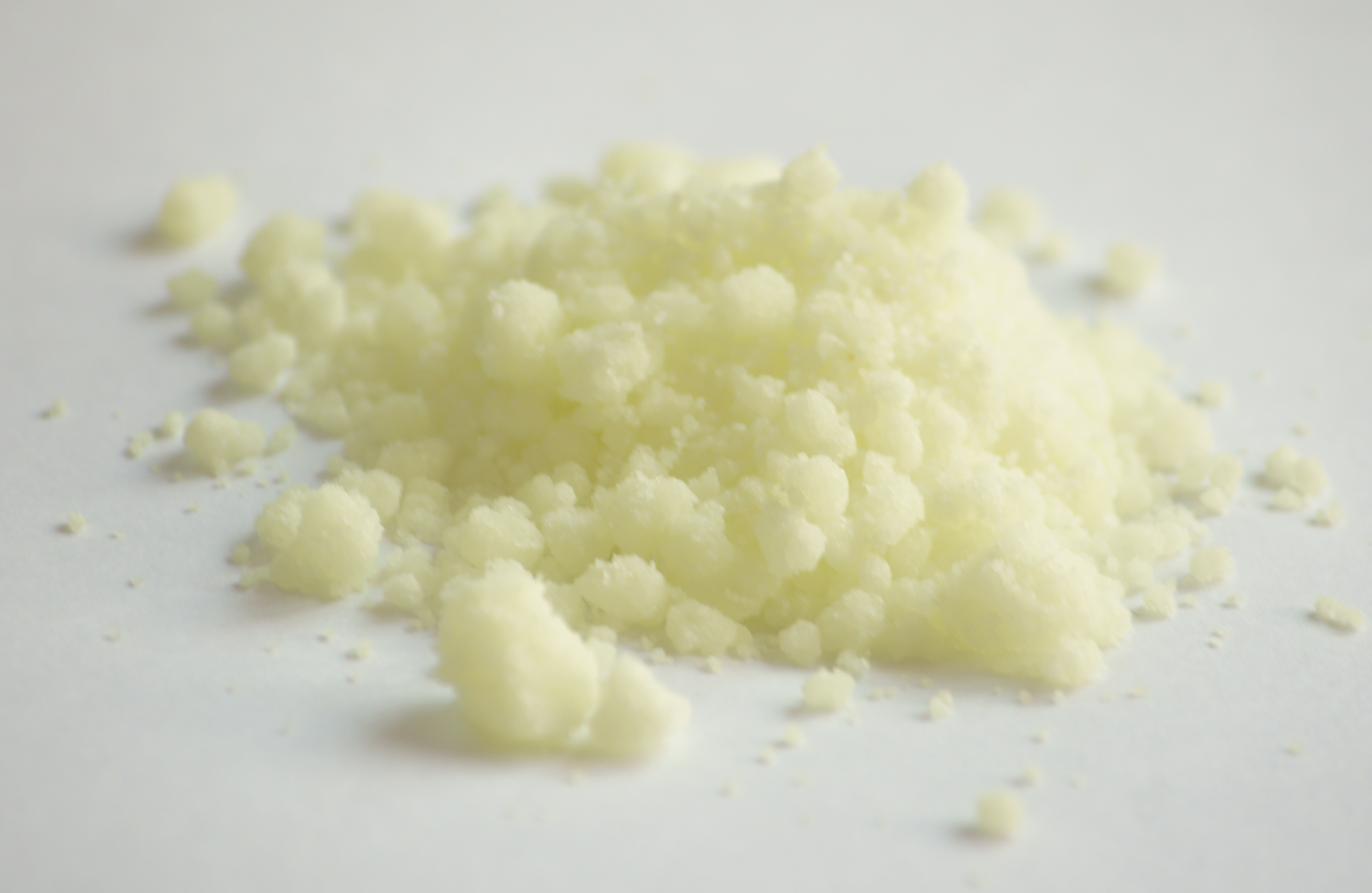

Names
- Preferred IUPAC name 1-Chloro-2,4-dinitrobenzene
- Other names Dinitrochlorobenzene; Chlorodinitrobenzene; 2,4-Dinitrochlorobenzene; 2,4-Dinitrophenyl chloride 4-Chloro-1,3-dinitrobenzene

Identifiers
CAS Number	97-00-7
3D model (JSmol)	Interactive image
Abbreviations	CDNB; DNCB
ChEBI	CHEBI:34718
ChemSpider	5
ECHA InfoCard	100.002.321
EC Number	202-551-4
PubChem CID	6
UNII	GE3IBT7BMN
CompTox Dashboard (EPA)	DTXSID6020278
- InChI: InChI=1S/C6H3ClN2O4/c7-5-2-1-4(8(10)11)3-6(5)9(12)13/h1-3H Key: VYZAHLCBVHPDDF-UHFFFAOYSA-N
- SMILES: c1cc(c(cc1[N+](=O)[O-])[N+](=O)[O-])Cl

Properties
Chemical formula	C_{6}H_{3}ClN_{2}O_{4}
Molar mass	202.55 g·mol^{−1}
Appearance	yellow crystals
Odor	almond-like
Density	1.6867 g/cm^{3}
Melting point	54 °C (129 °F; 327 K)
Boiling point	315 °C (599 °F; 588 K)
Solubility in water	Insoluble
Solubility	soluble in ether, benzene, CS_{2}
Refractive index (n_{D})	1.5857 (60 °C)

Hazards
NFPA 704 (fire diamond)	3 1 4
Explosive limits	2–22%
- Lethal dose or concentration (LD, LC)
LD_{50} (median dose)	1.07 g/kg (rat, oral)
- Except where otherwise noted, data are given for materials in their standard state (at 25 °C [77 °F], 100 kPa). verify (what is ?) Infobox references

2,4-Dinitrochlorobenzene (DNCB) is an organic compound with the chemical formula (O_{2}N)_{2}C_{6}H_{3}Cl. It is a yellow solid that is soluble in organic solvents. It is an intermediate for the industrial production of other compounds.

== Preparation and reactions ==
DNCB is produced commercially by the nitration of p-nitrochlorobenzene with a mixture of nitric and sulfuric acids. Other methods afford the compound less efficiently include the chlorination of 1,3-dinitrobenzene, nitration of o-nitrochlorobenzene and the dinitration of chlorobenzene.

By virtue of the two nitro substituents, the chloride in DNCB is particularly susceptible to nucleophilic substitution, at least relative to simple chlorobenzene. In this way, the compound is a precursor to many other compounds. For example, the chloride can be replaced by iodide easily.

Reaction of DNCB with ammonia gives 2,4-dinitrochloroaniline, again a versatile precursor.

DNCB is as a substrate in glutathione S-transferase, relevant to activity assays.

== Safety ==
DNCB induces a type IV hypersensitivity reaction in almost all people exposed to it, so it is used medically to assess the T cell activity in patients. This is a useful diagnostic test for immunocompromised patients. It can also be used to treat warts.

DNCB can cause contact dermatitis.
