= Flumioxazin =

Herbicide

Names
- IUPAC name 2-[7-fluoro-3-oxo-4-(prop-2-ynyl)-2H,4H-1,4-benzoxazin-6-yl]-4,5,6,7-tetrahydro-1H-isoindole-1,3(2H)-dione
- Other names Flumioxazine

Identifiers
CAS Number	103361-09-7
3D model (JSmol)	Interactive image
ChEBI	CHEBI:8939
ChEMBL	ChEMBL2133606
ChemSpider	83443
ECHA InfoCard	100.113.142
EC Number	600-425-7
KEGG	C11035
PubChem CID	92425
UNII	L0PX7OGI22
CompTox Dashboard (EPA)	DTXSID7032555
- InChI: InChI=1S/C19H15FN2O4/c1-2-7-21-15-9-14(13(20)8-16(15)26-10-17(21)23)22-18(24)11-5-3-4-6-12(11)19(22)25/h1,8-9H,3-7,10H2 Key: FOUWCSDKDDHKQP-UHFFFAOYSA-N
- SMILES: C#CCN1C(=O)COc2cc(F)c(N3C(=O)C4=C(CCCC4)C3=O)cc21

Properties
Chemical formula	C_{19}H_{15}FN_{2}O_{4}
Molar mass	354.337 g·mol^{−1}

Hazards
- GHS labelling
Pictograms	(GHS08: Health hazard) (GHS09: Environmental hazard)
Signal word	Warning
Hazard statements	H361d, H410
Precautionary statements	P203, P273, P280, P318, P391, P405, P501
- Except where otherwise noted, data are given for materials in their standard state (at 25 °C [77 °F], 100 kPa). Infobox references

Flumioxazin is a synthetic herbicide used for control of broadleaf weeds in agricultural areas. Valent U.S.A. Corporation, a division of Sumitomo Chemical, developed flumioxazin, which was approved by the U.S. EPA in 2001 for use on soybean and peanut crops. Flumioxazin has gained popularity due to pesticide resistance toward earlier active ingredients.

Flumioxazin is also used to control aquatic plants such as filamentous algae. In granular form, it is used to control of submerged plants, and as a direct foliar application it is used to control emergent and floating-leaf plants.

== Mode of action ==
Flumioxazin is an inhibitor of the enzyme protoporphyrinogen oxidase which then interferes with the plant's chlorophyll production.

Flumioxazin's HRAC classification is Group G (Australia), Group E (global), or Group 14 (numeric).

== Manufacture ==
The production of flumioxazin involves the use of 2,4-difluoronitrobenzene as a crucial raw material.
