= 2,4-Dinitroaniline =

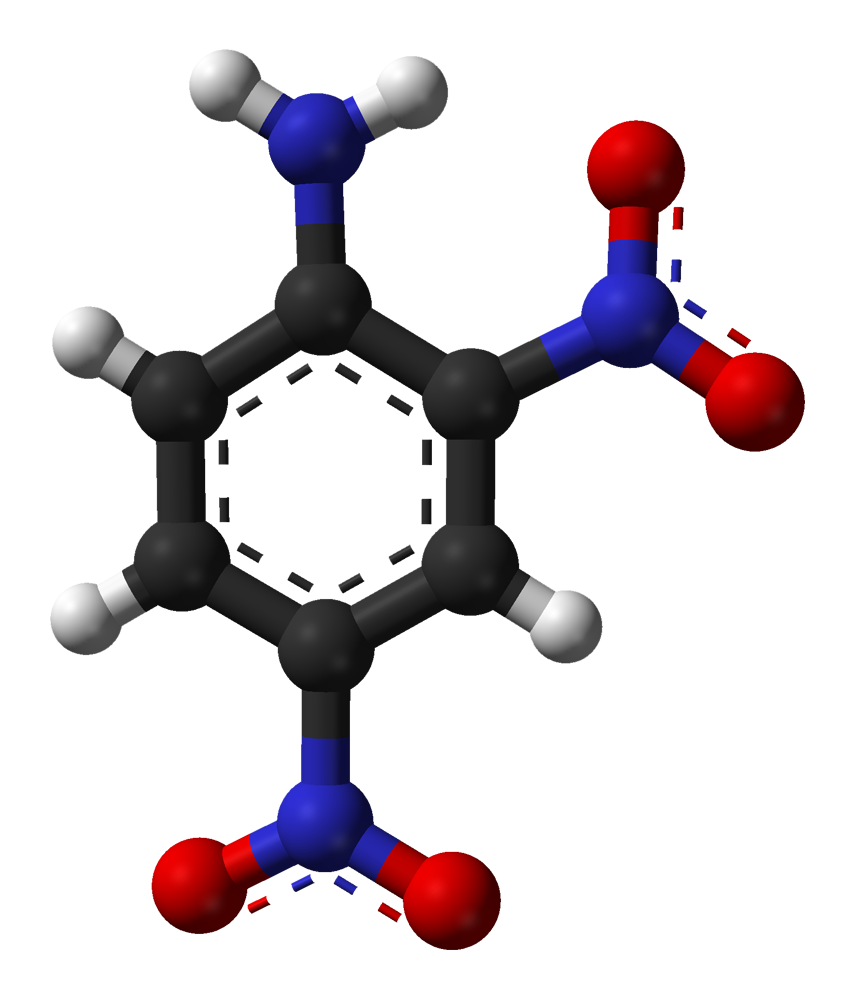
- The ball-and-stick structure of 2,4-dinitroaniline

- The chemical structure of 2,4-dinitroaniline

Names
- Preferred IUPAC name 2,4-Dinitroaniline
- Other names 1-Amino-2,4-dinitrobenzene

Identifiers
CAS Number	97-02-9
3D model (JSmol)	Interactive image
ChEBI	CHEBI:34242
ChEMBL	ChEMBL354318
ChemSpider	7045
ECHA InfoCard	100.002.322
EC Number	202-553-5
KEGG	C14713
PubChem CID	7321
RTECS number	BX9100000
UNII	5BI780R6W6
UN number	1596
CompTox Dashboard (EPA)	DTXSID1021823
- InChI: InChI=1S/C6H5N3O4/c7-5-2-1-4(8(10)11)3-6(5)9(12)13/h1-3H,7H2 Key: LXQOQPGNCGEELI-UHFFFAOYSA-N
- SMILES: C1=CC(=C(C=C1[N+](=O)[O-])[N+](=O)[O-])N

Properties
Chemical formula	C_{6}H_{5}N_{3}O_{4}
Molar mass	183.123 g·mol^{−1}
Appearance	Colorless to yellowish combustible powder
Density	1.61 g/cm^{3}
Melting point	187.8 °C (370.0 °F; 460.9 K)
Boiling point	Decomposes
Solubility in water	0.06 g/L (20 °C)
Solubility	Soluble in acetone, ethyl acetate, acetonitrile and most alcohols · insoluble in water
Acidity (pK_{a})	-4.53 (conjugate acid); 18.46

Hazards
- Occupational safety and health (OHS/OSH)
Main hazards	Toxic, Health and Environmental hazards
- GHS labelling
Pictograms	(GHS06: Toxic) (GHS08: Health hazard) (GHS09: Environmental hazard)
Signal word	Danger
Hazard statements	H300, H310, H330, H373, H411
Precautionary statements	P260, P262, P264, P270, P271, P273, P280, P284, P301+P310+P330, P302+P350, P304+P340+P310, P314, P362, P391, P403+P233, P405, P501
NFPA 704 (fire diamond)	3 1 3
Flash point	224 °C (435 °F; 497 K)
Autoignition temperature	350
- Lethal dose or concentration (LD, LC)
LD_{50} (median dose)	285 mg/kg (oral, rat)

Related compounds
Related compounds	2,4,6-Trinitroaniline 4-Nitroaniline
- Except where otherwise noted, data are given for materials in their standard state (at 25 °C [77 °F], 100 kPa). Infobox references

2,4-Dinitroaniline is an organic compound with a formula of (O_{2}N)_{2}C_{6}H_{3}NH_{2}. It is used as an intermediate in the manufacturing and production of pesticides, herbicides, pharmaceuticals, and dyes. Compared to aniline, the basicity of 2,4-dinitroaniline is even weaker.

== Preparation and reactions ==
2,4-Dinitroaniline can be prepared by reaction of 1-chloro-2,4-dinitrobenzene with ammonia. It can be also prepared by the nitration of aniline.

2,4-Dinitroaniline can be reduced to 1,2-diamino-4-nitrobenzene and further reduced to 1,2,4-triaminobenzene.

== Uses ==
It is used for the manufacture of certain azo dyes and disperse dyes, as well as in printing ink, toner, and the preparation of preservatives. The compound also finds applications as an intermediate in the synthesis of neutral dyes, sulfur dyes, and organic pigments.

== Safety ==
2,4-Dinitroaniline is toxic, with a lethal dose of 285 mg/kg. It is also reported to penetrate through skin leading to acute dermal toxicity ratings. Unlike other nitroaromatics, it is not classified as an explosive.

== See also ==
- 2,4,6-Trinitroaniline
- 4-Nitroaniline
