= Pendimethalin =

Names
- Preferred IUPAC name 3,4-Dimethyl-2,6-dinitro-N-(pentan-3-yl)aniline
- Other names: penoxalin; phenoxalin; pendimethaline

Identifiers
CAS Number	40487-42-1
3D model (JSmol)	Interactive image
ChEBI	CHEBI:83569
ChemSpider	35265
ECHA InfoCard	100.049.927
EC Number	254-938-2
KEGG	C11019
PubChem CID	38479
UNII	VL6L14C06U
UN number	3077 2588
CompTox Dashboard (EPA)	DTXSID7024245
- InChI: InChI=1S/C13H19N3O4/c1-5-10(6-2)14-12-11(15(17)18)7-8(3)9(4)13(12)16(19)20/h7,10,14H,5-6H2,1-4H3 Key: CHIFOSRWCNZCFN-UHFFFAOYSA-N; InChI=1/C13H19N3O4/c1-5-10(6-2)14-12-11(15(17)18)7-8(3)9(4)13(12)16(19)20/h7,10,14H,5-6H2,1-4H3 Key: CHIFOSRWCNZCFN-UHFFFAOYAS
- SMILES: CCC(CC)Nc1c([N+](=O)[O-])cc(C)c(C)c1[N+](=O)[O-]

Properties
Chemical formula	C_{13}H_{19}N_{3}O_{4}
Molar mass	281.312 g·mol^{−1}
Density	1.17 g/cm^{3}
Melting point	47 to 58 °C (117 to 136 °F; 320 to 331 K)
Boiling point	330 °C (626 °F; 603 K)
Solubility in water	0.275 ppm

Hazards
- GHS labelling
Pictograms	(GHS07: Exclamation mark) (GHS09: Environmental hazard)
Signal word	Warning
Hazard statements	H317, H410
Precautionary statements	P261, P272, P273, P280, P302+P352, P321, P333+P313, P363, P391, P501
- Except where otherwise noted, data are given for materials in their standard state (at 25 °C [77 °F], 100 kPa). verify (what is ?) Infobox references

Pendimethalin is a selective herbicide of the dinitroaniline class used preëmergently and postemergently to control annual grasses and certain broadleaf weeds. It inhibits cell division and cell elongation. Pendimethalin is approved in Europe, North America, South America, Africa, Asia and Oceania for different crops including cereals (wheat, barley, rye, triticale), corn, soybeans, rice, potato, legumes, fruits, vegetables, and nuts, plus lawns and ornamental plants.

It is also registered in Australia, (Note: For use on barley, wheat, including on crops on undersown lucerne, chickpeas, faba beans, field peas, lentils, lupins, safflower, cotton, soybeans, peanuts, navy beans, cow peas, mung beans, pigeon peas, sunflowers, sugarcane, rice, pasture, turf, many types of grass, canola, maize, broad beans, carrots, french beans, onions, brocolli, cabbage, cauliflower, tomatoes, lettuce, avocadoes, bananas, citrus, grapevines, lychees, macadamia net, mangoes, nuts, citrus, eucalypt forest plantations and pyrethrum.) South Africa, (Note: For potatoes.) Uganda and India.

== Use ==
Pendimethalin protects crops like wheat, corn, soybeans, potatoes, cabbage, peas, carrots, and asparagus. It controls annual grasses and certain broadleaf weeds which interfere with growth, yield and quality of crops by competing for nutrients, water and light.

Where weed infestation is particularly bad, yield loss can render wheat production uneconomical. Many other crops are grown in Europe that make a fraction of total agriculture. Herbicide options are limited for these minor crops, particularly in the vegetable sector. Long-term field studies call pendimethalin efficient for controlling blackgrass.

The related herbicide profluralin is more effective against johnsongrass than pendimethalin.

In 2012, 6–12 million pounds (2,700–5,400 t) of pendimethalin was used in the US.

== Mode of action ==
Pendimethalin acts pre-weed-emergence and early post-emergence. Pendimethalin is absorbed into roots and shoots, inhibits cell division and prevents growth, to prevent weeds from emerging.

The HRAC classifies by mode of action; pendimethalin is listed as Group K1, (global), AKA Group D (Australia) or Group 3 (numeric).

== Possible carcinogenic effects ==
At least one study suggests pendimethalin exposure is associated with pancreatic cancer.

A French study found no association with lung cancer.

The mechanism behind this purported increased risk is unknown, but pendimethalin exposure appears to reduce apoptosis in cultured tumor cells.

== Resistance ==
Herbicide resistance harms efficacy. Until 2009 pendimethalin showed no resistance. It is not cross-resistant with other grass weed herbicides, so pendimethalin can be coäpplied with herbicides of other modes of action. Lolium rigidum has evolved resistance to pendimethalin, at least in part due to increased cytochrome P450 activity. This resistance mechanism in ryegrass (shared with other dinitroanilines like trifluralin, see for longer explanation) is by an opposing mutation to resistance to prosulfocarb, a thiocarbamate herbicide. By evolving resistance to one, the weed devolves its resistance to the other.

== Registrative status ==
Pendimethalin is registered globally for a wide range of crops, by the European Commission, US-EPA, Canada-PMRA, Japan, Brazil-ANVISA and others.

== Toxicology ==
Pendimethalin is not toxic to mammals, though interestingly the oral LD_{50} for rats and mice is 1050-1620 mg/kg, yet for dogs and rabbits it is much less harmful, at over 5000 mg/kg. For comparison, table salt's LD_{50} is 3000 mg/kg. There may be chronic effects however; repeated or prolonged skin exposure may cause allergic reactions such as eczema, hives or anaphylaxis. Prolonged exposure by other routes may affect changes to the liver.

== Soil behavior ==
Pendimethalin is highly persistent in soil and water. It has high potential for bioaccumulation, and it is moderately mobile in soil, despite it adsorbing strongly into soil.

== Tradenames ==
Tradenames include Pendimethalin 440, Satellite, Halts, Prowl, PRE-M, Stomp, Stealth and Pendulum, Hilpendi etc.
