= Simazine =

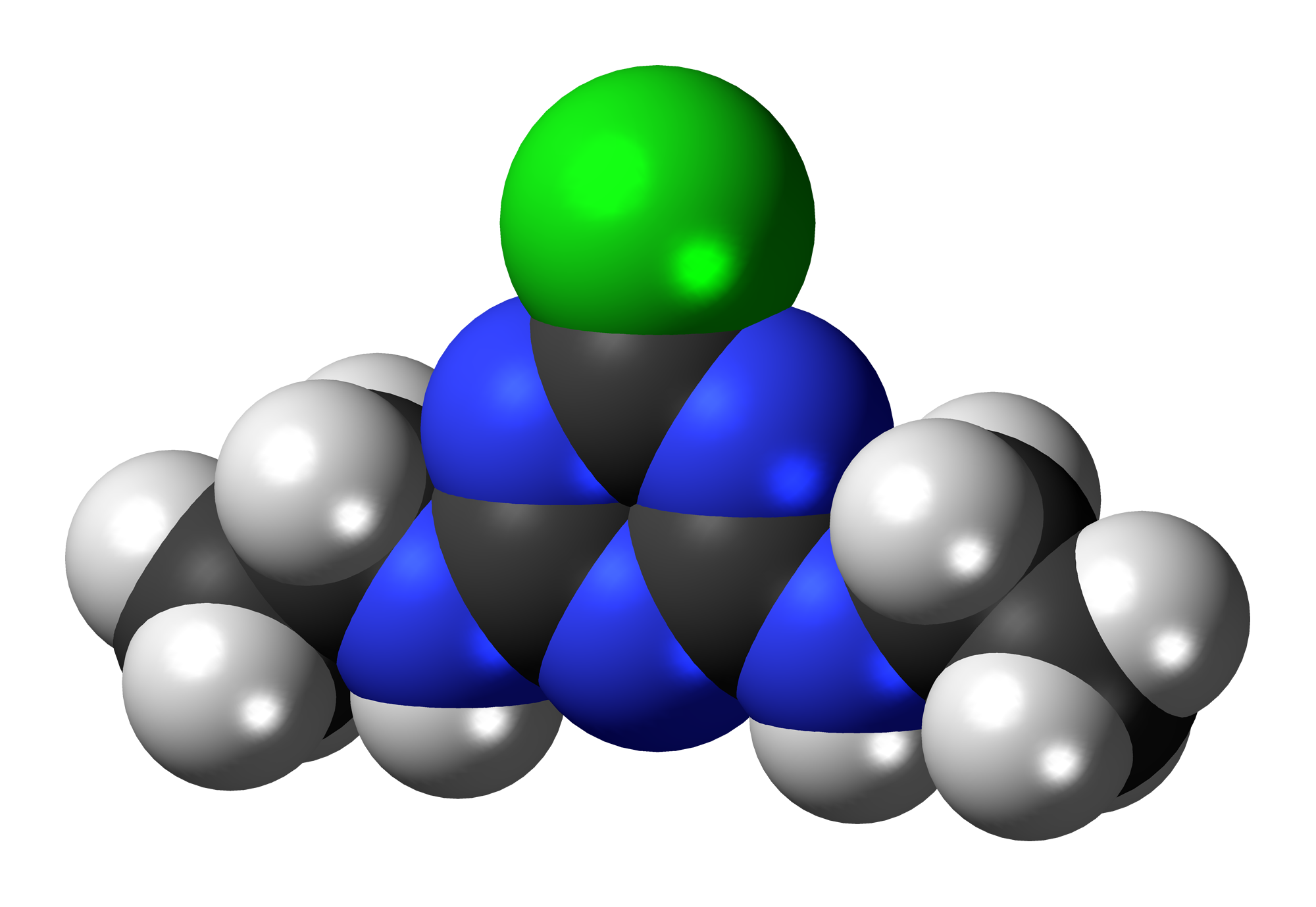

Names
- Preferred IUPAC name 6-Chloro-N^{2},N^{4}-diethyl-1,3,5-triazine-2,4-diamine

Identifiers
CAS Number	122-34-9
3D model (JSmol)	Interactive image
ChEBI	CHEBI:27496
ChEMBL	ChEMBL1605837
ChemSpider	5027
ECHA InfoCard	100.004.124
KEGG	C11172
PubChem CID	5216
UNII	SG0C34SMY3
CompTox Dashboard (EPA)	DTXSID4021268
- InChI: InChI=1S/C7H12ClN5/c1-3-9-6-11-5(8)12-7(13-6)10-4-2/h3-4H2,1-2H3,(H2,9,10,11,12,13) Key: ODCWYMIRDDJXKW-UHFFFAOYSA-N; InChI=1/C7H12ClN5/c1-3-9-6-11-5(8)12-7(13-6)10-4-2/h3-4H2,1-2H3,(H2,9,10,11,12,13) Key: ODCWYMIRDDJXKW-UHFFFAOYAN
- SMILES: Clc1nc(nc(n1)NCC)NCC

Properties
Chemical formula	C_{7}H_{12}ClN_{5}
Molar mass	201.66 g·mol^{−1}
Appearance	White crystalline powder
Density	1.3 g/cm^{3}
Melting point	225–227 °C (437–441 °F; 498–500 K)
Solubility in water	5 mg/L
Solubility in other solvents	Soluble in methanol, chloroform, and diethyl ether; slightly soluble in pentane
log P	1.9600
Vapor pressure	0.000810 mPa at 20 °C
- Except where otherwise noted, data are given for materials in their standard state (at 25 °C [77 °F], 100 kPa). verify (what is ?) Infobox references

Simazine is an herbicide of the triazine class. The compound is used to control broad-leaved weeds and annual grasses.

Simazine is registered in Australia and South Africa.

Simazine's HRAC classification is Group C1, Group C (global, Aus), Group 5 (numeric), as it inhibits photosynthesis at photosystem II.

== Preparation ==
Simazine may be prepared from cyanuric chloride and a concentrated solution of ethyl amine (at least 50 percent by number) in water. The reaction is highly exothermic and is therefore best carried out below 10 °C.

Cyanuric chloride decomposes at high temperatures into hydrogen chloride and hydrogen cyanide, both of which are highly toxic by inhalation.

== Properties and uses ==
Simazine is an off-white crystalline compound which is sparingly soluble in water. It is a member of the triazine-derivative herbicides, and was widely used as a residual non-selective herbicide, but is now banned in European Union states. Like atrazine, a related triazine herbicide, it acts by inhibiting photosynthesis. It remains active in the soil for two to seven months or longer after application.

== See also ==
- Atrazine
