= Clomazone =

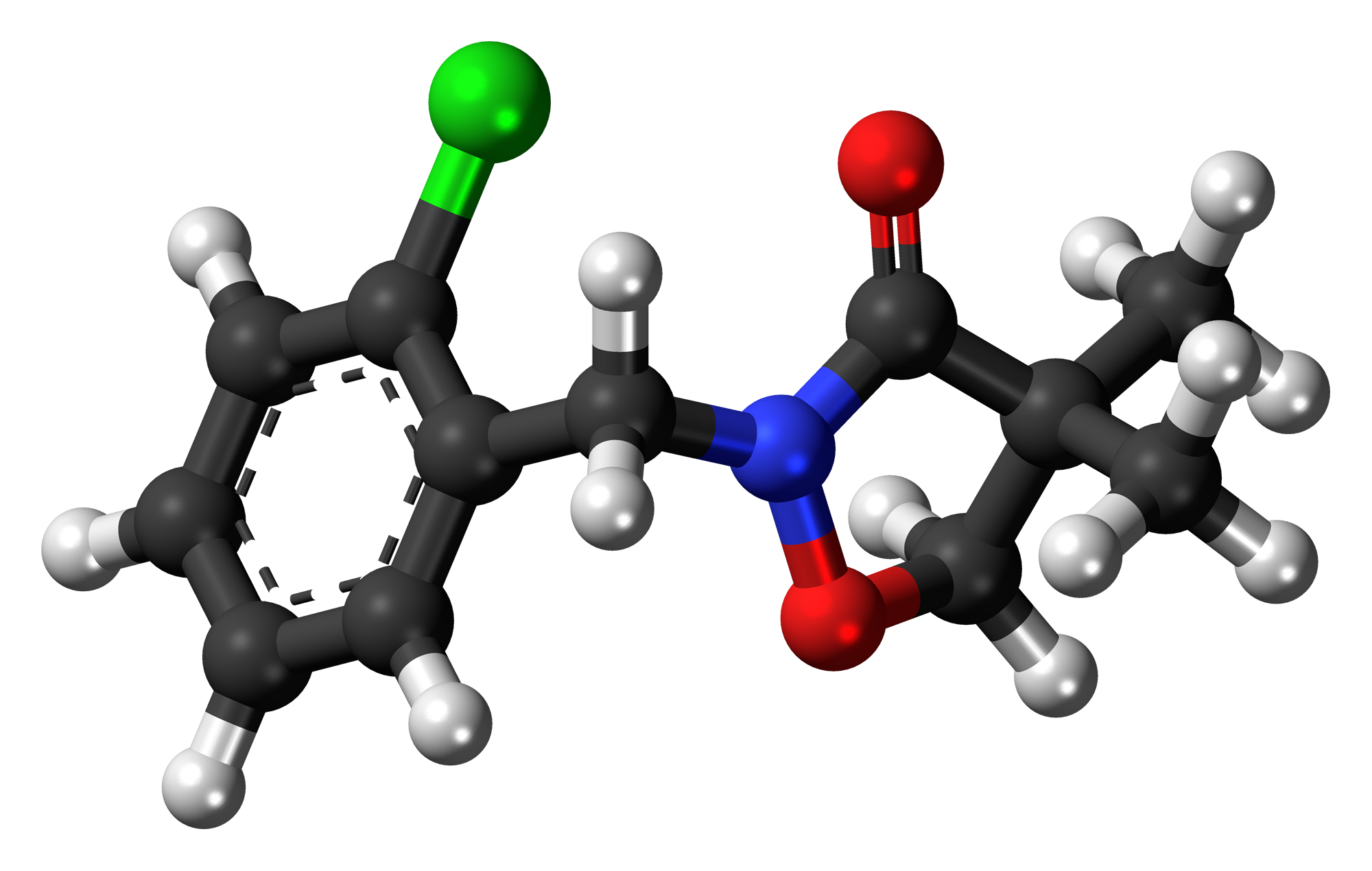

Names
- Preferred IUPAC name 2-[(2-Chlorophenyl)methyl]-4,4-dimethyl-1,2-oxazolidin-3-one
- Other names Dimethazone

Identifiers
CAS Number	81777-89-1
3D model (JSmol)	Interactive image
ChEBI	CHEBI:3751
ChEMBL	ChEMBL1076356
ChemSpider	49469
ECHA InfoCard	100.125.682
KEGG	C11095
PubChem CID	54778
UNII	570RAC03NF
CompTox Dashboard (EPA)	DTXSID1032355
- InChI: InChI=1S/C12H14ClNO2/c1-12(2)8-16-14(11(12)15)7-9-5-3-4-6-10(9)13/h3-6H,7-8H2,1-2H3 Key: KIEDNEWSYUYDSN-UHFFFAOYSA-N; InChI=1/C12H14ClNO2/c1-12(2)8-16-14(11(12)15)7-9-5-3-4-6-10(9)13/h3-6H,7-8H2,1-2H3 Key: KIEDNEWSYUYDSN-UHFFFAOYAD
- SMILES: Clc1ccccc1CN2OCC(C2=O)(C)C

Properties
Chemical formula	C_{12}H_{14}ClNO_{2}
Molar mass	239.69806
Appearance	white solid
Melting point	33.9 °C (93.0 °F; 307.0 K)
- Except where otherwise noted, data are given for materials in their standard state (at 25 °C [77 °F], 100 kPa). verify (what is ?) Infobox references

Clomazone is an agricultural herbicide, and has been the active ingredient of products named Command and Commence. The molecule consists of a 2-chlorobenzyl group bound to a nitrogen-oxygen heterocycle called a isoxazolidinone. It is a white solid.

Clomazone was first registered by the USEPA on March 8, 1993, and was commercialized by FMC Corporation. It is used for broadleaf weed control in several crops, including soybeans, peas, maize, rapeseed, sugar cane, cassava, pumpkins and tobacco. It may be applied pre-emergence of incorporated before planting the crop. Clomazone is relatively volatile (vapor pressure is 19.2 mPa) and vapors induce striking visual symptoms on non-target sensitive plants. Clomazone undergoes biological degradation, exhibiting a soil half life of one to four months. Adsorption of the herbicide to soil solids slows degradation and offgassing. Encapsulation helps reduce the compound's volatility and therefore reduces off-target damage to sensitive plants.

Clomazone suppresses the biosynthesis of chlorophyll and other plant pigments.
