= Linuron =

Herbicide

Identifiers
- IUPAC name: N'-(3,4-dichlorophenyl)-N-methoxy-N-methylurea
- CAS Number: 330-55-2
- PubChem CID: 9502
- ChemSpider: 9130
- UNII: 01XP1SU59O
- CompTox Dashboard (EPA): DTXSID2024163
- ECHA InfoCard: 100.005.779

Chemical and physical data
- Formula: C_{9}H_{10}Cl_{2}N_{2}O_{2}
- Molar mass: 249.09 g·mol^{−1}
- 3D model (JSmol): Interactive image
- Density: 1.49 g/cm^{3}
- Melting point: 93 to 95 °C (199 to 203 °F)
- SMILES: CON(C)C(=O)Nc1ccc(Cl)c(Cl)c1
- InChI: InChI=1S/C9H10Cl2N2O2/c1-13(15-2)9(14)12-6-3-4-7(10)8(11)5-6/h3-5H,1-2H3,(H,12,14); Key:XKJMBINCVNINCA-UHFFFAOYSA-N

Linuron is a phenylurea herbicide that is used to control the growth of grass and weeds for the purpose of supporting the growth of crops like soybeans. It is registered for use in India.

== Pharmacology ==
=== Mechanism of action ===
Linuron acts via inhibition of photosystem II, which is necessary for photosynthetic electron transport in plants. Fluometron's herbicide resistance class is Group C, (Australia), C2 (global), Group 7, (numeric, i.e. Group 5, due to a merger).

== Effects in animals ==
Linuron has been found to produce reproductive toxicity in animals by acting as an androgen receptor (AR) antagonist, and for this reason, is considered to be an endocrine disruptor. Consequently, in January 2017, the Standing Committee on Plants, Animals, Food and Feed (SCoPAFF) of the European Commission DG "Health and food safety" decided to not renew its regulatory approval. Sales are expected to cease by June 2017.

== See also ==
- Diuron
- Monolinuron
