= Oryzalin =

Chemical compound

Names
- IUPAC name 4-(Dipropylamino)-3,5-dinitrobenzenesulfonamide

Identifiers
CAS Number	19044-88-3
3D model (JSmol)	Interactive image
ChemSpider	27326
ECHA InfoCard	100.038.873
KEGG	C18877
PubChem CID	29393
UNII	662E385DWH
CompTox Dashboard (EPA)	DTXSID8024238
- InChI: InChI=1S/C12H18N4O6S/c1-3-5-14(6-4-2)12-10(15(17)18)7-9(23(13,21)22)8-11(12)16(19)20/h7-8H,3-6H2,1-2H3,(H2,13,21,22) Key: UNAHYJYOSSSJHH-UHFFFAOYSA-N
- SMILES: CCCN(CCC)c1c([N+](=O)[O-])cc(S(N)(=O)=O)cc1[N+](=O)[O-]

Properties
Chemical formula	C_{12}H_{18}N_{4}O_{6}S
Molar mass	346.36 g·mol^{−1}
Melting point	137–129 °C (279–264 °F; 410–402 K)
- Except where otherwise noted, data are given for materials in their standard state (at 25 °C [77 °F], 100 kPa). Infobox references

Oryzalin is an herbicide of the dinitroaniline class. It acts through the disruption (depolymerization) of microtubules, thus blocking anisotropic growth of plant cells. It can also be used to induce polyploidy in plants as an alternative to colchicine.

Oryzalin's mode of action is inhibition of microtubule assembly, so its HRAC classification is Group D (Australia), Group K1 (global), or Group 3 (numeric).

Roughly 250,000 pounds (110 t) was used in the US in 2019, down from about 750,000 pounds (340 t) in 2010, and 1,000,000 pounds (450 t) in 1995 (by USGS estimates).

== Research ==
Oryzalin has been studied for its potential use as an antiparasitic agent, particularly against Leishmania.
