= Cometabolism =

Cometabolism is defined as the simultaneous degradation of two compounds, in which the degradation of the second compound (the secondary substrate) depends on the presence of the first compound (the primary substrate). This is in contrast to simultaneous catabolism, where each substrate is catabolized concomitantly by different enzymes. Cometabolism occurs when an enzyme produced by an organism to catalyze the degradation of its growth-substrate to derive energy and carbon from it is also capable of degrading additional compounds. The fortuitous degradation of these additional compounds does not support the growth of the bacteria, and some of these compounds can even be toxic in certain concentrations to the bacteria.

The first report of this phenomenon was the degradation of ethane by the species Pseudomonas methanica. These bacteria degrade their growth-substrate methane with the enzyme methane monooxygenase (MMO). MMO was discovered to be capable of degrading ethane and propane, although the bacteria were unable to use these compounds as energy and carbon sources to grow.

Another example is Mycobacterium vaccae, which uses an alkane monooxygenase enzyme to oxidize propane. Accidentally, this enzyme also oxidizes, at no additional cost for M. vaccae, cyclohexane into cyclohexanol. Thus, cyclohexane is co-metabolized in the presence of propane. This allows for the commensal growth of Pseudomonas on cyclohexane. The latter can metabolize cyclohexanol, but not cyclohexane.

== Cometabolism in Bioremediation ==
Some of the molecules that are cometabolically degraded by bacteria are xenobiotic, persistent compounds, such as PCE, TCE, and MTBE, that have harmful effects on several types of environments. Co-metabolism is thus used as an approach to biologically degrade solvents.

Cometabolism can be used for the biodegradation of methyl-tert-butyl ether (MTBE): an aquatic environment pollutant. Some Pseudomonas members were found to be able to fully degrade MTBE cometabolically with the enzymes they produce to oxidize n-alkanes (e.g. methane, propane).

Additionally, a promising method of bioremediation of chlorinated solvents involves cometabolism of the contaminants by aerobic microorganisms in groundwater and soils. Several aerobic microorganisms have been demonstrated to be capable of doing this, including n-alkane, aromatic compound (e.g. toluene, phenol) and ammonium oxidizers. One example is Pseudomonas stutzeri OX1, which can degrade tetrachloroethylene (PCE). PCE, one of the major underground water contaminants, was regarded as being undegradable under aerobic conditions and only degraded via reductive dehalogenation to be used as a growth-substrate by organisms. Reductive dehalogenation often results in the partial dechlorination of the PCE, giving rise to compounds such as TCE, DCE, and vinyl chloride. Pseudomonas st. OX1 can degrade PCE under aerobic conditions by using toluene-o-xylene monooxygenase (ToMO), an enzyme they produce to derive energy and carbon from toluene and several other aromatic compounds. This biological process could be utilized to remove PCE from aerobic polluted sites.

However, the difficulties and high costs of maintaining the growth-substrates of the organisms capable of cometabolising these hazardous compounds and providing them an aerobic environment have led to the limited field-scale application of cometabolism for pollutant solvent degradation. Recently, this method of remediation has been proposed to be improved by the substitution of the synthetic aromatic growth-substrates (e.g. toluene) of these bacteria with cheap, plant secondary metabolites.
