= Trifluralin =

Weed control herbicide

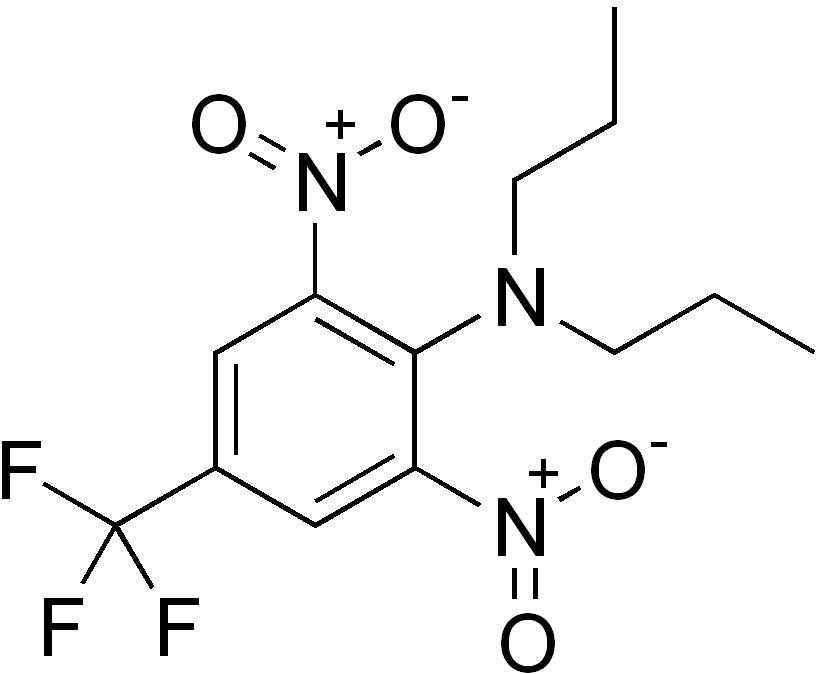

Names
- Preferred IUPAC name 2,6-Dinitro-N,N-dipropyl-4-(trifluoromethyl)aniline
- Other names Treflan; α,α,α-trifluoro-2,6-dinitro-N,N-dipropyl-p-toluidine

Identifiers
CAS Number	1582-09-8
3D model (JSmol)	Interactive image
ChEBI	CHEBI:35027
ChEMBL	ChEMBL31970
ChemSpider	5368
ECHA InfoCard	100.014.936
KEGG	C14343
PubChem CID	5569
UNII	C8BX46QL7K
CompTox Dashboard (EPA)	DTXSID4021395
- InChI: InChI=1S/C13H16F3N3O4/c1-3-5-17(6-4-2)12-10(18(20)21)7-9(13(14,15)16)8-11(12)19(22)23/h7-8H,3-6H2,1-2H3 Key: ZSDSQXJSNMTJDA-UHFFFAOYSA-N; InChI=1/C13H16F3N3O4/c1-3-5-17(6-4-2)12-10(18(20)21)7-9(13(14,15)16)8-11(12)19(22)23/h7-8H,3-6H2,1-2H3 Key: ZSDSQXJSNMTJDA-UHFFFAOYAB
- SMILES: [O-][N+](=O)c1cc(cc([N+]([O-])=O)c1N(CCC)CCC)C(F)(F)F

Properties
Chemical formula	C_{13}H_{16}F_{3}N_{3}O_{4}
Molar mass	335.283 g·mol^{−1}
Appearance	Yellow crystals
Density	1360 kg/m^{3}
Melting point	46 to 47 °C (115 to 117 °F; 319 to 320 K)
Boiling point	139 to 140 °C (282 to 284 °F; 412 to 413 K) (at 4.2 mmHg)
Solubility in water	0.0024 g/100 mL
Solubility in acetone	>1000 g/L

Hazards
- Occupational safety and health (OHS/OSH)
Main hazards	Toxic to aquatic life
- Lethal dose or concentration (LD, LC)
LD_{50} (median dose)	>5000 mg/kg (rat, oral)
- Except where otherwise noted, data are given for materials in their standard state (at 25 °C [77 °F], 100 kPa). verify (what is ?) Infobox references

Trifluralin is a common preemergent selective herbicide, a dinitroaniline. With about 14 million pounds (6,400 t) used in the United States in 2001, and 3–7 million pounds (1,400–3,200 t) in 2012, it is one of the most widely used herbicides. Trifluralin is also used in Australia, New Zealand, Iran, India, Brazil and previously in the EU. Introduced in 1964, Trifluralin was the first organofluorine compound used as an agrochemical.

Trifluralin is applied to the soil to control annual grass and broadleaf weed species. It inhibits root development by interrupting mitosis and controls weeds as they germinate. Trifluralin moves very little inside the plant, remaining in the roots.

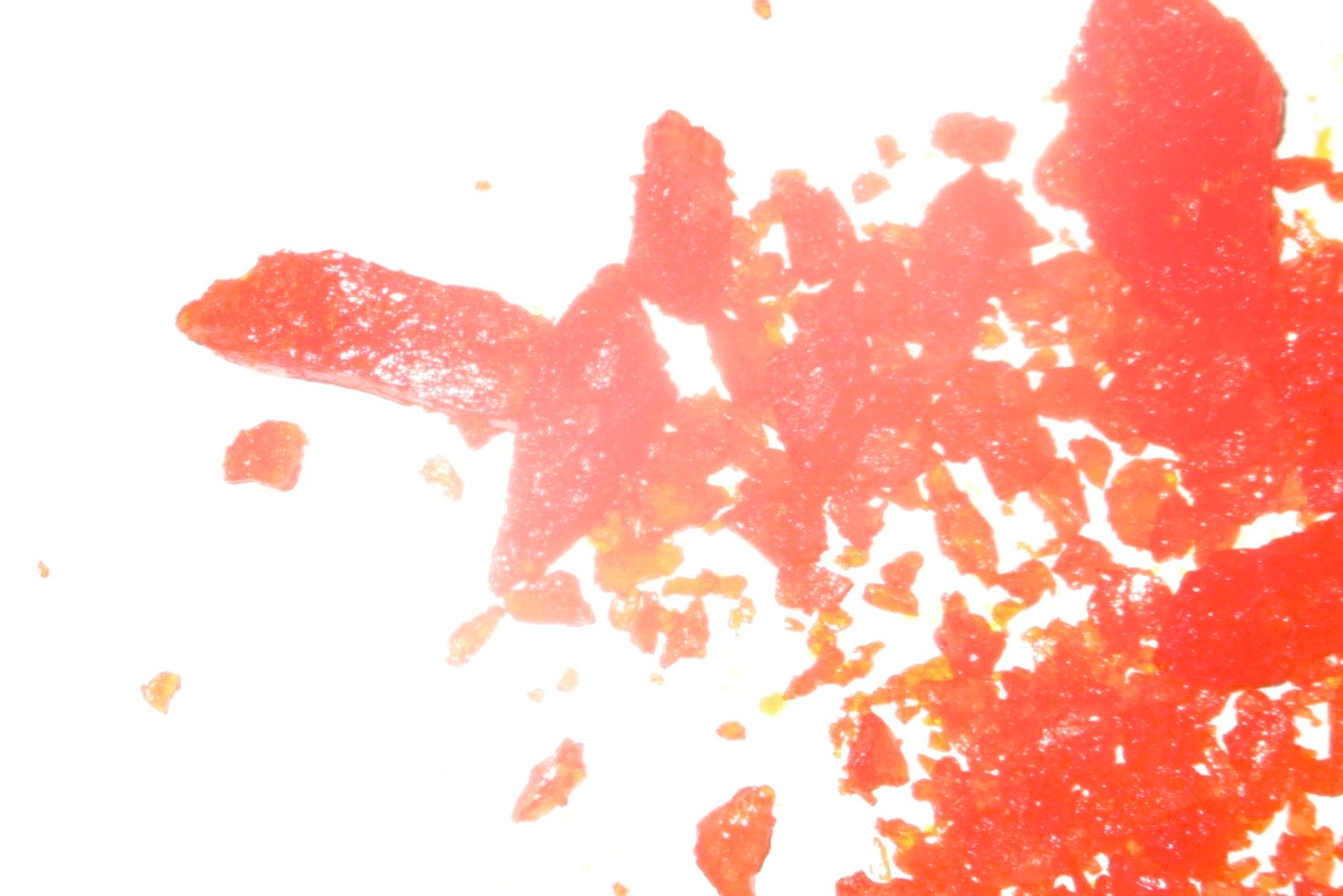
Technical grade trifluralin crystals

== Discovery ==
Selective herbicides were unavailable in the 1950s to protect soybean and cotton, so Lilly Research Laboratories screened ~2000 compounds from 1958 to 1980, blindly looking for a result. (2,4-DNP could have been used, but had to be exactingly applied lest it destroy the crops.) Trifluralin was initially thought a failure, yet the plots stayed free of weeds weeks later. Application by incorporation into the top soil instead was eight times more potent. Pre-plant soil incorporation was a new technique at the time. It is unclear why trifluralin's exotic 4-trifluoromethyl was tested so early (1960), before more common candidates such as fluoro, bromo, or iodo.

=== History ===
By 1968, trifluralin was internationally available, including Australia and New Zealand, and trifluralin was the 5th most used herbicide in the US, at 22,960,000 pounds (10,410 t) by 1974. The efficient post-emergent acetolactate synthase and ACCase inhibitors developed in 1980s significantly replaced trifluralin, though the trifluralin market has resurged, with weeds developing resistance to the post-emergents, and with rising no-till or low-till farming techniques.

Trifluralin was introduced to Latin America. It is used on sugarcane and soybean in Brazil, where 4.16 million pounds (1,890 t) was used in 2019.

=== Analogs ===
Related compounds show similar herbicidal properties. In a study of 16, trifluoromethyl (as trifluralin is) compounds proved more active preemergently, and methyl compounds more active postemergently. Replacing trifluralin's two propyl groups (with ethyl, allyl or butyl) yielded lower preemergent activity in all cases; postemergent activity was highest in ethyl, allyl combination analogs.

Nitralin replaces the trifluroromethyl group with a methylsulfonyl. Benfluralin replaces the propyl-propyl groups with ethyl-butyl. Profluralin replaces one propyl group with cyclopropylmethyl. Profluralin and nitralin are mostly obsolete, but benfluralin is commercially used, though less so than trifluralin.

== Mechanism and effects ==
=== Microtubule inhibition ===
Trifluralin, or other dinitroanilines, inhibits microtubule formation, by binding to tubulin proteins. Tubulin polymerises into microtubules, which make up the cellular cytoskeleton. Trifluralin binds to tubulin, and this misshapen 'herbicide complex' is incorporated into the growing microtubule, blocking further tubulin binding, and halting cell-division. It also depolymerises (splits) microtubules.

Dinitroanilines hit microtubules in plants and protists, but not animals, nor fungi, nor carrots, whose microtubules, even in purified form in laboratory work, are unaffected.

Due to the low solubility, high soil-adhesion and high volatility, dinitroaniline herbicides are absorbed into plants primarily via gaseous vapour.

=== Resistance ===
Resistance, where evolved, can be through mutated α- or β-tubulin, particularly common in protists. This resistance is especially hard to evolve for weeds to tubulin disrupting herbicides because both α-tubulin and β-tubulin must mutate, as imbalance between their expressions is potentially lethal. Non-target-site resistance is usually though increased metabolism of trifluralin. Mobility-related mechanisms are not effective as minimal movement in the weed is needed to prevent germination.

Resistance has been shown to devolve under repeated application of prosulfocarb on lolium rigidum (ryegrass). Supposedly, the mechanism of prosulfocarb-resistance is inverse to trifluralin resistance, requiring lower metabolism of herbicide, rather than greater. Therefore, when growing resistance for with one mechanism, the weeds undo their resistance to the other. Some resistance mechanisms impose severe fitness cost on weeds, such as much reduced growth rate. Resistance has also been reduced experimentally by applying the organo-phosphate insecticide phorate, which reduces plants' production of the enzyme P450s, thus reducing metabolism of trifluralin in-plant.

Trifluralin is a Group D resistance class, (Aus), K1 or 3. (global or numeric) Other Group D herbicides will experience resistance near identically.

=== Symptoms ===
Wheat and triticale, if affected by trifluralin, display reduced root extension, increased number of seminal roots, increased root diameter and decreased root dry weight.

== Environmental regulation ==
Trifluralin has been banned in the European Union since 20 March 2008, primarily due to high toxicity to aquatic life. Specifically, due to aquatic risk, the toxicity of trifluralin's metabolites to sediment-organisms, and potential consumer exposure for non-cereal crops. They also had concerns over the aquatic toxicity, "high" potential for bioaccumulation, "high persistence in soil" and a potential for long range movement in the wind.

The United Kingdom banned it under the same legislation. With IPU banned at the same time, few options were left for farmers to control black-grass.

Trifluralin is on the United States Environmental Protection Agency list of Hazardous Air Pollutants as a regulated substance under the Clean Air Act.

== Application ==
Trifluralin is typically sold as emulsifiable concentrate or granules. Application rates vary, such as 0.8-3.0 L of 480 g/L formulation per hectare, typically diluted with water, and other compatible herbicides, e.g. isoproturon, to be sprayed in one go.

Trifluralin must be incorporated into soil within 24 hours of sowing, or in some cases sooner. Various methods achieve this; most involve machinery set to 5–13 cm deep. This is to minimise volatilisation losses from trifluralin's relatively high vapour pressure. Selectivity is possible even on susceptible crops, by sowing below the herbicide band, and shallower germinating weeds will be controlled. Stubble-cover reduces effectiveness, but a greater water rate offsets the effect. A test saw 53% control of ryegrass at 30 L/Ha become 78% control at 150 L/Ha. Droplet size did not affect the results, and a similar effect was seen with pyroxasulfone, despite large differences in adsorption and solubility.

== Environmental behavior ==
Trifluralin breaks down into many products as it degrades, ultimately being incorporated into soil-bound residues or converted to carbon dioxide (mineralized). Among the more unusual behaviors of trifluralin is inactivation in wet soils. This has been linked to transformation of the herbicide by reduced soil minerals, which in turn had been previously reduced by soil microorganisms using them as electron acceptors in the absence of oxygen. This environmental degradation process has been reported for many structurally related herbicides (dinitroanilines) as well as a variety of explosives such as TNT and picric acid.

Trifluralin has a long half-life in soil of ~180 days, but it is accepted at high application rates because of its low soil mobility and high volatility. It is extremely resistant to leaching, and shows little lateral soil movement. Repeated annual application shows steady and continuous decline in soil and does not accumulate, even applied well in excess of recommended rates.

Ultraviolet light can cause degradation. Trifluralin is stable to hydrolysis.

Trifluralin is cometabolised by microörganisms in sewage, as are nitrofen, fluchloralin and profluralin; i.e. enzymes from other active metabolic processes also break up these chemicals. Over 88 days, trifluralin levels reduced by 49% under aerobic conditions. Discontinuous anaerobic conditions sped this up, with a 91% reduction, forming 7 metabolites.

== Health effects ==
Trifluralin is safe for mammals and chickens, even in large amounts. Mammals eliminate 85% after oral consumption within 72 hours. It is toxic to fish though: LC_{50} for rainbow trout is 10-40 μg/L. Metabolism involves the thyroid; heavy and continuous exposure in rats can stress it via overstimulation.

=== Cancer ===
There is discussion of trifluralin being carcinogenic. Some studies have shown links, such as a 1986 study of three non-hodgkin lymphoma cases. A later, larger study found no significant relation. A review study examined trifluralin against kinds of cancer, finding no link except to colon cancer, which was found in only one studied cohort. Research on humans remains unconvincing, but EPA animal toxicity data "supports the possible carcinogenicity" of trifluralin. No association exists with lung cancer. Trifluralin exposure can reduce cell apoptosis.

Trifluralin on mammalian ovaries (tested in mice, at 150 mg/kg/day) showed no effect on oocyte quality, but may induce a stress response in ovarian somatic cells. Fertility was unaffected. Levels of pRb stayed unchanged, though trifluralin raised levels of p53, a tumor suppressing gene, by 2.5 times. The additional p53 appeared not to increase rates of apoptosis.

=== Food ===
Due to trifluralin's high vapour pressure, food residue is reduced in processing, especially in high temperature processes, such as in the mashing of beer.

== Medical use ==
Trifluralin, as ointment, can treat leishmaniasis (a parasitic disease) welts on the skin. It and other dinitroanilines are tubulin-binding agents with selective antileishmanial properties. Leishmaniasis killed 60,000 people in 2001. Research is stymied by trifluralin's low water solubility and easy sublimation. Analogues have been tried, and some show greater efficacy than miltefosine; all trifluralin analogues have the benefits of being non-hemolytic and having lower cell toxicity.

Trifluralin also has anti-malarial properties and accumulates in parasite-infected erythrocytes, though low solubility makes effective administration of trifluralin difficult. Treatment of toxoplasma gondii and cryptosporidiosis is effective but limited due to solubility. Liposome-administered trifluralin has been used to treat leishmania in dogs successfully.

== Tradenames and lists ==
- Trifluralin
- Treflan
- TriflurX
- Trilin
- Trust
- Tri-4
- Edge
- Snapshot (formulation of isoxaben and trifluralin)

Commercial formulations have included trifluralin mixtures with: linuron, napropamide, metribuzin, clomazone, tebutam, bromoxynil and ioxynil, isoproturon, terbutryn, trietazine, neburon and isoxaben.

Crops trifluralin is used in include: Wheat, barley, cotton, triticale, rye, sunflowers, sugar cane, peas, canola, safflower, peanuts, tobacco, pigeon peas, lupins, lucerne, linseed, legume seed, strawberry, lentils, faba beans, chickpeas, cowpeas, lablab, mung beans, borlotti beans, red beans, adzuki beans, citrus fruit, lettuce, capsicums, tomatoes, artichokes, onions, garlic, brassicas, sugar beet, parsnips, carrots or soya. Trifluralin has had a huge market to control black-grass, but the weed was not listed on the label as being susceptible.
