= List of compounds with carbon number 13 =

This is a partial list of molecules that contain 13 carbon atoms.

Chemical formula	Synonyms	CAS number
C_{13}H_{5}Cl_{5}O_{3}	pentachlorophenyl salicylate	36994-69-1
C_{13}H_{7}MoNO_{5}	isocyanotoluenemolybdenum pentacarbonyl	109316-13-4
C_{13}H_{8}Br_{3}NO_{2}	tribromsalan	87-10-5
C_{13}H_{8}F_{2}O_{3}	diflusinal	22494-42-4
C_{13}H_{8}N_{2}O_{3}S	nitroscanate	19881-18-6
C_{13}H_{8}OS	thioxanthone	492-22-8
C_{13}H_{8}O_{2}	xanthone	90-47-1
C_{13}H_{9}	fluorenyl radical	2299-68-5
C_{13}H_{9}Cl_{2}NO_{4}	chlomethoxyfen	32861-85-1
C_{13}H_{9}F_{3}N_{2}O_{2}	niflumic acid	4394-00-7
C_{13}H_{9}N	acridine	260-94-6
C_{13}H_{9}N	phenanthridine	229-87-8
C_{13}H_{9}NO	fluorenone oxime	2157-52-0
C_{13}H_{9}P	acridophosphine	398-14-1
C_{13}H_{10}	fluorene	86-73-7
C_{13}H_{10}	1H-phenalene	203-80-5
C_{13}H_{10}ClNO	diphenylcarbamoyl chloride	83-01-2
C_{13}H_{10}Cl_{2}N_{2}O_{3}	carfentrazone	128621-72-7
C_{13}H_{10}HgO_{3}	phenylmercuric salicylate	28086-13-7
C_{13}H_{10}N_{2}O_{2}S	thiantoin	7772-37-4
C_{13}H_{10}O	fluorenol	1689-64-1
C_{13}H_{10}O	benzophenone	119-61-9
C_{13}H_{10}O	xanthene	92-83-1
C_{13}H_{10}O_{2}	furfural acetophenone	717-21-5
C_{13}H_{10}O_{3}	diphenyl carbonate	102-09-0
C_{13}H_{10}O_{5}	isopimpinellin	482-27-9
C_{13}H_{10}S	methyldibenzothiophene	30995-64-3
C_{13}H_{10}S	thioxanthene	261-31-4
C_{13}H_{11}	diphenylmethyl radical	4471-17-4
C_{13}H_{11}F	fluorodiphenylmethane	579-55-5
C_{13}H_{11}NO	acridine monohydrate	500013-99-0
C_{13}H_{11}N_{3}	proflavine	92-62-6
C_{13}H_{12}	diphenylmethane	101-81-5
C_{13}H_{12}N_{2}O	harmine	442-51-3
C_{13}H_{12}N_{2}O	salicyaldehyde phenylhydrazone	614-65-3
C_{13}H_{12}N_{2}O_{3}	alphenal	115-43-5
C_{13}H_{12}N_{4}	diphenyl formazan	1885-34-3
C_{13}H_{12}OS	benzyl phenyl sulfoxide	833-82-9
C_{13}H_{12}O_{2}	monobenzone	103-16-2
C_{13}H_{12}O_{2}S	benzyl phenyl sulfone	3112-88-7
C_{13}H_{12}S	diphenylmethanethiol	4237-48-3
C_{13}H_{13}Cl_{2}N_{3}O_{3}	iprodione	36734-19-7
C_{13}H_{13}N	aminodiphenylmethane	91-00-9
C_{13}H_{13}N	cyclopentylidenephenylacetonitrile	21713-75-7
C_{13}H_{13}OP	methyl diphenylphosphinite	4020-99-9
C_{13}H_{13}O_{4}P	diphenyl methyl phosphate	115-89-9
C_{13}H_{14}	isopropylnaphthalene	29253-36-9
C_{13}H_{14}F_{3}N_{3}O_{4}	ethalfluralin	55283-68-6
C_{13}H_{14}N_{2}O	harmaline	304-21-2
C_{13}H_{14}N_{2}O_{3}	methylphenobarbital	115-38-8
C_{13}H_{14}O	isovalerylphenylacetylene	23566-47-4
C_{13}H_{14}O_{6}	methylphthalyl ethyl glycolate	85-71-2
C_{13}H_{15}Cl_{2}NO	clorgyline	17780-72-2
C_{13}H_{15}NO_{2}	glutethimide	77-21-4
C_{13}H_{16}ClNO	ketamine	100477-72-3
C_{13}H_{16}F_{3}NO	nonadecanone	1939-26-0
C_{13}H_{16}F_{3}N_{3}O_{4}	benfluralin	1861-40-1
C_{13}H_{16}F_{3}N_{3}O_{4}	trifluralin	1582-09-8
C_{13}H_{16}NO_{4}PS	isoxathion	18854-01-8
C_{13}H_{16}N_{2}O_{2}	aminoglutethimide	125-84-8
C_{13}H_{16}N_{2}O_{2}	melatonin	73-31-4
C_{13}H_{16}N_{2}O_{2}S	thialbarbitone	467-36-7
C_{13}H_{16}O	phenyl cyclohexyl ketone	712-50-5
C_{13}H_{16}O_{4}	ethyl benzyl succinate	106478-00-6
C_{13}H_{17}ClN_{2}O_{2}	moclobemide	71320-77-9
C_{13}H_{17}F_{3}N_{4}O_{4}	prodiamine	29091-21-2
C_{13}H_{17}N	pentamethylphenylacetonitrile	34688-70-5
C_{13}H_{17}NO	crotamiton	483-63-6
C_{13}H_{17}NO_{2}	encyprate	2521-01-9
C_{13}H_{17}NO_{3}	lophophorine	17627-78-0
C_{13}H_{17}N_{3}O	aminopyrine	58-15-1
C_{13}H_{18}Br_{2}N_{2}O	ambroxol	18683-91-5
C_{13}H_{18}ClNO	Bupropion	34911-55-2
C_{13}H_{18}ClNO	Xylachlor	63114-77-2
C_{13}H_{18}ClNO	monalide	7287-36-7
C_{13}H_{18}ClNO_{2}	alaproclate	60719-82-6
C_{13}H_{18}ClNO_{2}	ethachlor	51218-31-6
C_{13}H_{18}FeO_{2}	pentamethylcyclopentadienyl dicarbonyl methyl iron	52409-66-2
C_{13}H_{18}N_{2}O_{2}	lenacil	2164-08-1
C_{13}H_{18}N_{2}O_{3}	heptabarbital	509-86-4
C_{13}H_{18}N_{2}O_{4}	musk tibetene	145-39-1
C_{13}H_{18}N_{4}O_{3}	oxpentifylline	6493-05-6
C_{13}H_{18}O	cyclohexylphenylmethanol	945-49-3
C_{13}H_{18}O	heptanophenone	1671-75-6
C_{13}H_{18}O_{2}	dimethylphenylethylcarbinyl acetate	103-07-1
C_{13}H_{18}O_{2}	pentyl phenylacetate	5137-52-0
C_{13}H_{18}O_{3}	isoamyl mandelate	5421-04-5
C_{13}H_{18}O_{5}S	ethofumesate	26225-79-6
C_{13}H_{18}O_{7}	salicin	138-52-3
C_{13}H_{19}ClNO_{3}PS_{2}	anilofos	64249-01-0
C_{13}H_{19}ClN_{2}O	butanilicaine	3785-21-5
C_{13}H_{19}ClN_{2}O_{2}	chloroprocaine	133-16-4
C_{13}H_{19}NO_{2}	carnegine	490-53-9
C_{13}H_{19}NO_{2}	cyclohexylammonium benzoate	3129-92-8
C_{13}H_{19}NO_{2}	hexyl phenylcarbamate	7461-26-9
C_{13}H_{19}NO_{2}S	thanite	115-31-1
C_{13}H_{19}NO_{3}	methylanhalonidine	83-14-7
C_{13}H_{19}NO_{3}	viloxazine	46817-91-8
C_{13}H_{19}N_{3}O_{4}	dipropalin	1918-08-7
C_{13}H_{19}N_{3}O_{4}	pendimethalin	64667-17-0
C_{13}H_{19}N_{3}O_{4}	penoxaline	40487-42-1
C_{13}H_{19}N_{3}O_{6}S	nitralin	4726-14-1
C_{13}H_{20}N_{2}O_{2}	butethamine	2090-89-3
C_{13}H_{20}N_{2}O_{2}	dropropizine	17692-31-8
C_{13}H_{20}N_{4}O_{2}	pentifylline	1028-33-7
C_{13}H_{20}O	edulan i	41678-29-9
C_{13}H_{20}O	edulan ii	41678-30-2
C_{13}H_{20}O	ionone	8013-90-9
C_{13}H_{20}O	isoamyl phenylethyl ether	56011-02-0
C_{13}H_{20}O	myrac aldehyde 1	52475-89-5
C_{13}H_{20}O	myrac aldehyde 2	37677-14-8
C_{13}H_{20}O_{3}	methyl jasmonate	1211-29-6
C_{13}H_{20}O_{4}	diethyl diallylmalonate	3195-24-2
C_{13}H_{20}O_{8}	pentaerythritole tetraacetate	597-71-7
C_{13}H_{21}N	butylamphetamine	51799-33-8
C_{13}H_{21}NO_{2}	tigloidine	495-83-0
C_{13}H_{21}NO_{2}	toliprolol	2933-94-0
C_{13}H_{21}NO_{3}	moprolol	5741-22-0
C_{13}H_{21}N_{2}O_{4}PS	butamifos	36335-67-8
C_{13}H_{21}N_{5}O_{2}	etamiphyllin	314-35-2
C_{13}H_{21}O_{3}PS	kitazin p	26087-47-8
C_{13}H_{22}NO_{3}PS	fenamiphos	22224-92-6
C_{13}H_{22}N_{2}O	noruron	18530-56-8
C_{13}H_{22}N_{4}O_{3}S	ranitidine	66357-35-5
C_{13}H_{22}O	dihydroedulan i	63335-66-0
C_{13}H_{22}O	dihydroedulan ia	74006-61-4
C_{13}H_{22}O	nerylacetone	3879-26-3
C_{13}H_{22}O_{2}	bornyl propionate	78548-53-5
C_{13}H_{22}O_{2}	isobornyl propionate	2756-56-1
C_{13}H_{22}O_{3}	carbonic acid dicyclohexyl ester	4427-97-8
C_{13}H_{22}O_{3}Si	benzyltriethoxysilane	2549-99-7
C_{13}H_{23}NS	cyclododecyl isothiocyanate	59037-64-8
C_{13}H_{24}	isopropyldecalin	27193-29-9
C_{13}H_{24}Cl_{6}O_{8}P_{2}	phosgard 2xc20	38051-10-4
C_{13}H_{24}N_{2}O	cuscohygrine	454-14-8
C_{13}H_{24}N_{2}O	N,N'-dicyclohexyl urea	2387-23-7
C_{13}H_{24}N_{2}O_{2}	cropropamide	633-47-6
C_{13}H_{24}O	cyclotridecanone	832-10-0
C_{13}H_{24}O	dicyclohexylmethanol	4453-82-1
C_{13}H_{24}O	tetrahydroionone	60761-23-1
C_{13}H_{24}O_{2}	allyl decanoate	57856-81-2
C_{13}H_{24}O_{2}	decyl acrylate	2156-96-9
C_{13}H_{24}O_{2}	nonyl methacrylate	2696-43-7
C_{13}H_{24}O_{4}	diethyl azelate	624-17-9
C_{13}H_{24}O_{4}	dimethyl undecanedioate	4567-98-0
C_{13}H_{24}O_{4}	tridecanedioic acid	505-52-2
C_{13}H_{25}N	tridecane nitrile	629-60-7
C_{13}H_{25}NS	dodecyl isothiocyanate	1072-32-8
C_{13}H_{25}NS	dodecyl thiocyanate	765-15-1
C_{13}H_{25}O_{2}Tl	thallium tridecanoate	80006-41-3
C_{13}H_{26}	cyclotridecane	295-02-3
C_{13}H_{26}	heptylcyclohexane	5617-41-4
C_{13}H_{26}O	cyclododecyl methyl ether	2986-54-1
C_{13}H_{26}O	tridecanal	10486-19-8
C_{13}H_{26}O	tridecanone	57702-05-3
C_{13}H_{26}O_{2}	decyl propionate	5454-19-3
C_{13}H_{26}O_{2}	hexyl heptanoate	1119-06-8
C_{13}H_{26}O_{2}	pentyl octanoate	638-25-5
C_{13}H_{26}O_{2}	propyl decanoate	30673-60-0
C_{13}H_{26}O_{2}	tridecanoic acid	638-53-9
C_{13}H_{26}O_{3}	decyl lactate	42175-34-8
C_{13}H_{26}O_{3}	peroxytridecanoic acid	40915-96-6
C_{13}H_{28}	tridecane	629-50-5
C_{13}H_{28}O_{7}	hexaethylene glycol monomethyl ether	23601-40-3
C_{13}H_{29}N	methyldodecylamine	7311-30-0
C_{13}H_{29}N	octamylamine	502-59-0
C_{13}H_{29}N	tridecylamine	2869-34-3
C_{13}H_{30}O_{6}P_{2}	tetraisopropyl methylenediphosphonate	1660-95-3
C_{13}H_{30}Sn	methyltributyltin	1528-01-4
C_{13}H_{32}N_{2}OSi_{2}	urea ditbdms	82475-73-8

== See also ==
- Carbon number
- List of compounds with carbon number 12
- List of compounds with carbon number 14
