= C13H18N2O2 =

The molecular formula C_{13}H_{18}N_{2}O_{2} may refer to:

- 4-Hydroxy-5-methoxydimethyltryptamine, also known as 4-HO-5-MeO-DMT or psilomethoxin
- Lenacil
- Methoxypiperamide
