= Sulfentrazone =

Names
- Preferred IUPAC name N-{2,4-Dichloro-5-[4-(difluoromethyl)-3-methyl-5-oxo-4,5-dihydro-1H-1,2,4-triazol-1-yl]phenyl}methanesulfonamide
- Other names FMC97285, F6285

Identifiers
CAS Number	122836-35-5
3D model (JSmol)	Interactive image
ChEBI	CHEBI:9339
ChemSpider	77887
ECHA InfoCard	100.109.173
KEGG	C11125
MeSH	C475571
PubChem CID	86369
UNII	7TY7WT1599
CompTox Dashboard (EPA)	DTXSID6032645
- InChI: InChI=1S/C11H10Cl2F2N4O3S/c1-5-16-19(11(20)18(5)10(14)15)9-4-8(17-23(2,21)22)6(12)3-7(9)13/h3-4,10,17H,1-2H3 Key: OORLZFUTLGXMEF-UHFFFAOYSA-N; InChI=1/C11H10Cl2F2N4O3S/c1-5-16-19(11(20)18(5)10(14)15)9-4-8(17-23(2,21)22)6(12)3-7(9)13/h3-4,10,17H,1-2H3 Key: OORLZFUTLGXMEF-UHFFFAOYAF
- SMILES: CC1=NN(C(=O)N1C(F)F)C2=C(C=C(C(=C2)NS(=O)(=O)C)Cl)Cl

Properties
Chemical formula	C_{11}H_{10}Cl_{2}F_{2}N_{4}O_{3}S
Molar mass	387.190
Density	0.53 g/cm^{3}
Melting point	122 °C (252 °F; 395 K)
Solubility in water	780 mg/L (20 °C)
log P	0.991
Acidity (pK_{a})	6.56

Hazards
- GHS labelling
Pictograms	(GHS07: Exclamation mark) (GHS08: Health hazard) (GHS09: Environmental hazard)
Signal word	Warning
Hazard statements	H332, H373, H411
Precautionary statements	P260, P271, P273, P304+P312, P304+P340, P312, P314, P391, P501
- Except where otherwise noted, data are given for materials in their standard state (at 25 °C [77 °F], 100 kPa). Infobox references

Sulfentrazone is the ISO common name for an organic compound used as a broad-spectrum herbicide. It acts by inhibiting the enzyme protoporphyrinogen oxidase. It was first marketed in the US in 1997 by FMC Corporation with the brand name Authority.

== History ==
In 1985, scientists at FMC Corporation filed patents on a new class of herbicides containing a triazolinone ring. Sulfentrazone was subsequently developed for market under the code number F6285, with first sales in 1991 and achieving registration in the US in 1997, branded Authority. Other compounds now in the triazolinone class include amicarbazone and carfentrazone.

== Mechanism of action ==
The effects visible on whole plants are chlorosis and desiccation caused by the inhibition of the enzyme protoporphyrinogen oxidase, which leads to an accumulation of protoporphyrin IX in the plant cells. This is a potent photosensitizer which activates oxygen, leading to lipid peroxidation. Both light and oxygen are required for this process to kill the plant.

== Usage ==
In the United States, the Environmental Protection Agency (EPA) is responsible for regulating pesticides under the Federal Insecticide, Fungicide, and Rodenticide Act (FIFRA), the Food Quality Protection Act (FQPA) and the Pesticide Registration Improvement Act (PRIA). A pesticide can only be used legally according to the directions on the label that is included at the time of the sale of the pesticide. The purpose of the label is "to provide clear directions for effective product performance while minimizing risks to human health and the environment". A label is a legally binding document that mandates how the pesticide can and must be used and failure to follow the label as written when using the pesticide is a federal offence.

The label includes use for removal of sedges and newly emerged broadleaf weeds including purple and yellow nutsedge, Kyllinga, plantain, clover, spurge, woodsorrel, knotweed, chickweed, curly dock, wild onion, and wild garlic. It is also effective on many grasses including Poa annua, Poa trivialis, creeping bentgrass, fine & tall fescue, perennial ryegrass, Kentucky & rough bluegrass, bahiagrass, Bermuda grass, buffalograss, carpetgrass, centipedegrass, kikuyugrass, seashore paspalum, St. Augustine grass, and zoysiagrass.

Sulfentrazone can be used both pre- and post-emergence and is rapidly metabolised by soybean at the methyl group of the triazolinone ring, which confers a level of safety to that crop.

The estimated annual use of sulfentrazone in US agriculture is mapped by the US Geological Service and shows that in 2017, the latest date for which figures are available, approximately 3,800,000 pounds (1,700,000 kg) were applied — mainly in soybean. The compound is not registered for use in the European Union, although another triazolinone, carfentrazone-ethyl, is available there. Sulfentrazone also has uses outside agriculture: it controls vegetation on roadside verges and railroads. The active ingredient has been sold alone or in combination with other herbicides under a large number of brand names including Dismiss, Solitaire and Spartan. Suppliers and brand names in the United States are listed in the National Pesticide Information Retrieval System.

== Human safety ==
The LD_{50} of sulfentrazone is more than 2800 mg/kg (rats, oral), which means that it is of low toxicity by oral ingestion. The US Code of Federal Regulations records the maximum residue tolerances in various food products.
