= Amicarbazone =

Weed control herbicide

Names
- IUPAC name 4-Amino-N-tert-butyl-4,5-dihydro-3-isopropyl-5-oxo-1H-1,2,4-triazole-1-carboxamide
- Preferred IUPAC name 4-Amino-N-tert-butyl-5-oxo-3-(propan-2-yl)-4,5-dihydro-1H-1,2,4-triazole-1-carboxamide
- Other names: MKH 3586; BAY 314666; 4-Amino-N-(1,1-dimethylethyl)-4,5-dihydro-3-(1-methylethyl)-5-oxo-1H-1,2,4-triazole-1-carboxamide

Identifiers
CAS Number	129909-90-6
3D model (JSmol)	Interactive image
ChEBI	CHEBI:132840
ChemSpider	135660
ECHA InfoCard	100.113.790
EC Number	603-373-3
PubChem CID	153920
UNII	7FU145I60E
CompTox Dashboard (EPA)	DTXSID3034329
- InChI: InChI=1S/C10H19N5O2/c1-6(2)7-13-15(9(17)14(7)11)8(16)12-10(3,4)5/h6H,11H2,1-5H3,(H,12,16) Key: ORFPWVRKFLOQHK-UHFFFAOYSA-N
- SMILES: CC(C)C1=NN(C(=O)N1N)C(=O)NC(C)(C)C

Properties
Chemical formula	C_{10}H_{19}N_{5}O_{2}
Molar mass	241.295 g·mol^{−1}
Density	1.12 kg/L
Melting point	137.5 °C (279.5 °F; 410.6 K)
Solubility in water	4.6 g/L
Solubility	most soluble in acetonitrile, acetone, dichloromethane
Solubility in dimethyl sulfoxide	250 g/L
Solubility in ethyl acetate	140 g/L
Solubility in 2-propanol	110 g/L
Solubility in propylene glycol	79 g/L
Solubility in 1-octanol	43 g/L
Solubility in xylene	9.2 g/L
Vapor pressure	1.3 μPa (20 °C); 3 μPa (25 °C)

Hazards
- GHS labelling
Pictograms	(GHS07: Exclamation mark) (GHS09: Environmental hazard)
Signal word	Warning
Hazard statements	H302, H332, H410
Precautionary statements	P261, P264, P270, P271, P273, P301+P317, P304+P340, P317, P330, P391, P501
- Except where otherwise noted, data are given for materials in their standard state (at 25 °C [77 °F], 100 kPa). Infobox references

Amicarbazone is a triazolinone herbicide used for pre-emergent and early post-emergent control of creeping bentgrass, Kentucky bluegrass, fescue, and ryegrass. It is used in Australia, the United States, and Japan. It was discovered in 1988 and first registered in 2005 in the USA.

Amicarbazone is chemically related to carfentrazone, flucarbazone, propoxycarbazone and sulfentrazone.

Amicarbazone's HRAC Group is Group 5, Group C1, Group C (Numeric, Global, Australian), as it works by inhibiting acetolactase synthase in the weeds' photosystem II.

It should be applied at 350 to 700 g/Ha active ingredient. It is registered in the US as a 70% DF (Dry Flowable) formulation.
