= DCPA =

DCPA can refer to:

- Denver Center for the Performing Arts
- DCPA, the herbicide propanil from its chemical name 3',4'-DiChloroPropionAnilide: especially in Japanese sources
- DCPA, the herbicide dimethyl tetrachloroterephthalate from an abbreviation used by the Weed Science Society of America. Use of these abbreviations can cause confusion between the two chemicals
- DCPA, anhydrous dicalcium phosphate the mineral monetite
- Depot cyproterone acetate
