= 1,2-Dibromo-3-chloropropane =

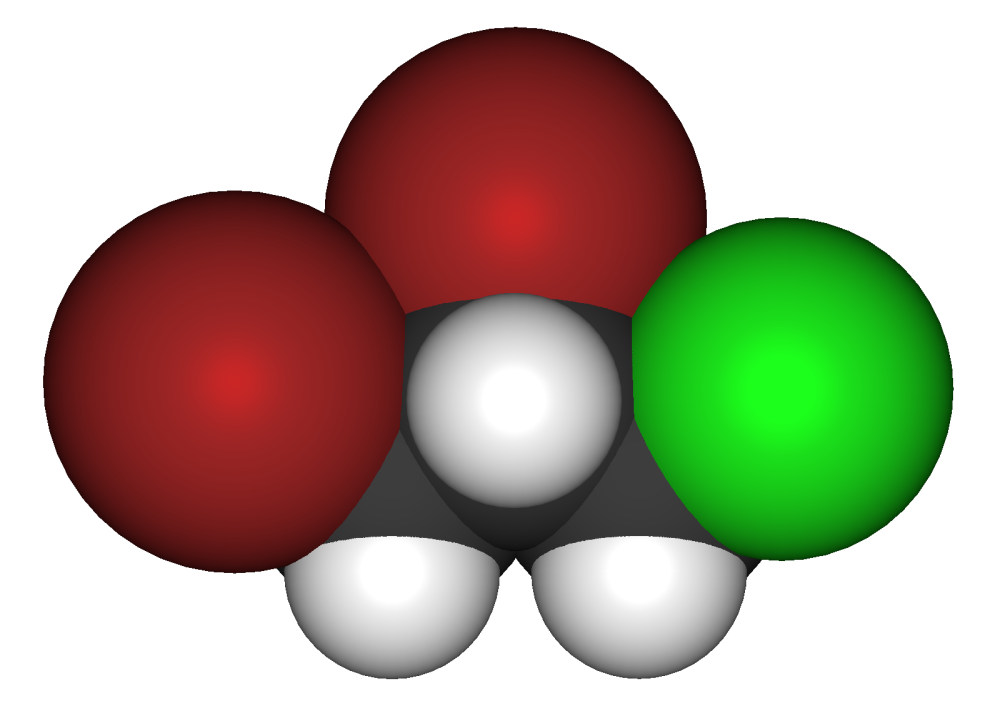

Names
- Preferred IUPAC name 1,2-Dibromo-3-chloropropane
- Other names Dibromochloropropane

Identifiers
CAS Number	96-12-8
3D model (JSmol)	Interactive image
Abbreviations	DBCP
ChemSpider	7008
ECHA InfoCard	100.002.255
KEGG	C14336
PubChem CID	7280
UNII	96K0FD4803
CompTox Dashboard (EPA)	DTXSID3020413
- InChI: InChI=1S/C3H5Br2Cl/c4-1-3(5)2-6/h3H,1-2H2 Key: WBEJYOJJBDISQU-UHFFFAOYSA-N; InChI=1/C3H5Br2Cl/c4-1-3(5)2-6/h3H,1-2H2 Key: WBEJYOJJBDISQU-UHFFFAOYAN
- SMILES: BrC(CBr)CCl

Properties
Chemical formula	C_{3}H_{5}Br_{2}Cl
Molar mass	236.33 g/mol
Appearance	Dense colorless liquid
Odor	pungent
Density	2.05 g/mL
Melting point	6.1 °C (43.0 °F; 279.2 K)
Boiling point	195.5 °C (383.9 °F; 468.6 K)
Solubility in water	0.1%
Vapor pressure	0.8 mmHg (20 °C)

Hazards
- Occupational safety and health (OHS/OSH)
Main hazards	carcinogen
- GHS labelling
Pictograms	(GHS06: Toxic) (GHS08: Health hazard)
Hazard statements	H301, H340, H350, H360, H373, H412
Precautionary statements	P201, P273, P301+P310, P308+P313
NFPA 704 (fire diamond)	2 1 1
Flash point	76.7 °C (170.1 °F; 349.8 K)
- NIOSH (US health exposure limits)
PEL (Permissible)	TWA 0.001 ppm
REL (Recommended)	Ca
IDLH (Immediate danger)	Ca, N.D.
- Except where otherwise noted, data are given for materials in their standard state (at 25 °C [77 °F], 100 kPa). verify (what is ?) Infobox references

1,2-Dibromo-3-chloropropane (dibromochloropropane), better known as DBCP, is the organic compound with the formula BrCH(CH_{2}Br)(CH_{2}Cl). It is a dense colorless liquid although commercial samples often appear amber or even brown. It is the active ingredient in the nematicide Nemagon, also known as Fumazone.

It is a soil fumigant formerly used in American agriculture. In mammals, it causes male sterility at high levels of exposure. After discovery of its deleterious health effects on humans, the compound was banned from use in 1979 by the United States Environmental Protection Agency (EPA). The continuing presence of the chemical as a contaminant in ground water remains a problem for many communities for years after end of use.

== Stereoisomerism ==
1,2-Dibromo-3-chloropropane (2 stereoisomers)
(R)-configuration	(S)-configuration

== Uses ==
- Until 1977, DBCP was used as a soil fumigant and nematocide on over 40 different crops in the United States. It fights pests that attack the roots of fruit trees and boosts the weight of harvests by 20 percent. From 1977 to 1979, EPA suspended registration for all DBCP-containing products except for use on pineapples in Hawaii. In 1985, EPA issued an intent to cancel all registrations for DBCP, including use on pineapples. Subsequently, the use of existing stocks of DBCP was prohibited.
- DBCP is also sometimes used as a starting material in organic synthesis.

== Sources and potential exposure ==
Human exposure to DBCP could result from the ingestion of contaminated drinking water and food. Exposure could also result from inhalation and/or skin contact with a product containing DBCP.

In the past, release of DBCP to the environment occurred primarily from its fumigant and nematocide uses; because of the cancellation of all DBCP uses, environmental exposure is expected to decline with time.

== Examples of persistence ==
DBCP residues have persisted in contaminated soil and groundwater long after applications have ceased. For example, in agricultural areas around Turlock in the Central Valley of California, DBCP was applied to crops in the 1970s. As late as 1989, DBCP persistence was reported in groundwater that was previously used for beneficial purposes, and numerous nearby wells had to be shut down at that time.

== Lawsuits ==
Workers at the Dow Chemical plant producing DBCP were made sterile by exposure to DBCP. These male reproductive effects were consistent with animal experiments showing that DBCP sterilizes rabbits. One contract worker at the production plant successfully sued the company. Most workers remained with the company and in a company sponsored medical program until the facility was sold in 1987. At that time, some of the workers did file suit against the company. However, the suit was denied due to statute of limitations issues.

Most uses of the chemical in the United States were banned in 1977. Amid growing concerns over DBCP's effects on male workers, Dow ceased production and reclaimed DBCP that had been shipped to its users.

However, despite warnings from Dow about its health effects, the Dole Food Company, which was using the chemical on its banana plantations in Latin America, threatened to sue Dow if it stopped DBCP shipments. Dow then shipped half a million gallons of DBCP to Dole, much of it reclaimed from other users. Plantation workers who became sterile or were stricken with other maladies subsequently sued Dow and Dole in Nicaraguan courts, alleging that their ailments were caused by DBCP exposure. Under a special law that was passed specifically for DBCP litigation, the Nicaraguan courts ruled in favor of the plaintiffs and awarded them over US$600 million in damages. When plaintiff lawyers tried to enforce one of those judgments in the United States, the U.S. District Court in Florida held that "the credible and unrefuted medical testimony in this case is that it is factually impossible for what is represented in the Judgment to have occurred," and that due process "do[es] not permit awarding damages in the face of clear scientific evidence of the absence of causation," or, as in this case, "with proof that [the defendants] are not at fault." A group of workers then filed lawsuits in the United States, and on November 5, 2007, a Los Angeles jury awarded them US$3.2 million. On July 15, 2010, that judgment was thrown out after the Court presiding over the case found that the claims were part of "a massive fraud perpetrated on the court". On April 23, 2009, a Los Angeles judge also threw out two similar cases against Dole and Dow Chemical due to fraud and extortion by lawyers in Nicaragua recruiting fraudulent plaintiffs to make claims against the company. The ruling casts doubt on US$2 billion in judgments in similar lawsuits.

Workers in Côte d'Ivoire, using the Alien Tort Claims Act, and claiming sterility, crimes against humanity, and genocide, sued (in Abagninin v. AMVAC Chemical Corp. [No. 07-56326]), these manufacturers of DBCP: Amvac Chemical, Dow Chemical, Shell Oil Company, as well as Dole Food Company, who used it on overseas crops, but never used it in Côte d'Ivoire. The United States Court of Appeals for the Ninth Circuit ruled against the workers in September 2008, stating that the plaintiffs did not show that the defendants had "specific intent" to intend harm against the workers and the citizens of the country. To be found guilty of genocide the defendant must have knowingly set out to commit the offense.

== Safety ==
DBCP causes a dramatic decrease in male fertility, ranging from oligospermia (low sperm count) to azoospermia (lack of sperm).
