= Terbufos =

Names
- Preferred IUPAC name S-[(tert-Butylsulfanyl)methyl] O,O-diethyl phosphorodithioate
- Other names: Counter; Contraven; Aragan

Identifiers
CAS Number	13071-79-9
3D model (JSmol)	Interactive image
ChemSpider	23912
ECHA InfoCard	100.032.679
PubChem CID	25670
UNII	M83BN0F8R9
CompTox Dashboard (EPA)	DTXSID2022254
- InChI: InChI=1S/C9H21O2PS3/c1-6-10-12(13,11-7-2)15-8-14-9(3,4)5/h6-8H2,1-5H3 Key: XLNZEKHULJKQBA-UHFFFAOYSA-N; InChI=1/C9H21O2PS3/c1-6-10-12(13,11-7-2)15-8-14-9(3,4)5/h6-8H2,1-5H3 Key: XLNZEKHULJKQBA-UHFFFAOYAH
- SMILES: S=P(OCC)(SCSC(C)(C)C)OCC

Properties
Chemical formula	C_{9}H_{21}O_{2}PS_{3}
Molar mass	288.42 g·mol^{−1}
Appearance	clear, colorless to pale yellow or reddish-brown liquid
Density	1.105 g/mL (at 24 °C)
Melting point	−29.2 °C (−20.6 °F; 244.0 K)
Boiling point	69 °C (156 °F; 342 K)
Solubility in water	< 1 mg/mL
Solubility	Freely soluble in organic compounds
Vapor pressure	0.0003 mmHg

Hazards
- GHS labelling
Pictograms	(GHS06: Toxic) (GHS08: Health hazard) (GHS09: Environmental hazard)
Signal word	Danger
Hazard statements	H227, H300, H310, H330, H361, H370, H372, H410
Precautionary statements	P201, P202, P210, P233, P235, P260, P262, P264, P270, P271, P273, P280, P281, P284, P301, P302, P304, P307, P308, P310, P311, P313, P314, P320, P321, P330, P340, P350, P361, P363, P370, P378, P391, P403, P405, P501
NFPA 704 (fire diamond)	4 3 0
Flash point	88 °C (190 °F; 361 K)
- Lethal dose or concentration (LD, LC)
LD_{50} (median dose)	Rat (male), Oral LD50 = 13 mg/kg Rat (female), Oral LD50 = 8 mg/kg Rat (male), Dermal LD50 = 123 mg/kg Rat (female), Dermal LD50 = 71 mg/kg
LC_{50} (median concentration)	Rat (male), Inhalation (4 hr): 0.017 mg/L Rat (female), Inhalation(4 hr): 0.015 mg/L Rat (male), Inhalation (1 hr calculated): 0.068 mg/L Rat (female), Inhalation (1 hr): 0.06 mg/L
- NIOSH (US health exposure limits)
PEL (Permissible)	0 ppm
REL (Recommended)	0 ppm
- Safety data sheet (SDS)

Pharmacology
Routes of administration	Intraocular; Oral; Epicutaneous; Inhalation
- Pharmacokinetics
Excretion	Urine (86.9 - 96 %)
- Except where otherwise noted, data are given for materials in their standard state (at 25 °C [77 °F], 100 kPa). Infobox references

Terbufos is a chemical compound used in insecticides and nematicides. It is part of the chemical family of organophosphates. It is a clear, colourless to pale yellow or reddish-brown liquid and sold commercially as granulate.

== History ==
Terbufos is used on various crops including bananas, beans, citrus, coffee, groundnuts, sorghum, potatoes, sunflowers and maize as soil cover to combat wireworms, mossy beetles, beet flies and the black bean louse. It is not approved for use in the European Union and prohibited in most African countries, although it is permitted with restrictions in the United States. Also the World Health Organization classifies terbufos as a class Ia compound, meaning that terbufos is extremely hazardous. The maximum residue limit in the European Union is 0.01 mg/kg terbufos for most crops and animal products. The compound was first registered in 1974 in the United States, together with a United States patent of organophosphates for use in corn fields to deter corn rootworms. Between 1987 and 1996, an average of about 7.5 million pounds (about 3,400 tons) of the compound was used each year. In November 2006, BASF sold its global Terbufos insecticide business to American AMVAC (American Vanguard Corporation).

Organophosphate poisoning is not common in the developed world. Most cases of terbufos poisoning occur in the developing world, where protection against pesticides is scarce, but compounds such as terbufos are widespread, uncontrolled by a government and readily available for farmers.

== Available forms ==
Terbufos is available in granules for application in the agricultural sector. The compound is applied at planting in a band or on the seed furrow directly.

== Structure and reactivity ==
=== Structure ===
Terbufos, also known as S-((tert-butylthio)methyl) O,O-diethyl phosphorodithioate, is a compound classified as an organophosphate. Terbufos consists of a central phosphorus atom, surrounded by four different groups. This central atom is surrounded by two ethoxy groups, one double-bonded sulfur atom and a (tert-butylthio)methanethiol group.

=== Reactivity ===
Terbufos is practically insoluble in water, but can be dissolved freely in organic compounds. It decomposes after prolonged heating at 120 °C and can be hydrolysed when exposed to strong bases (pH>9) and acids (pH<2).

== Synthesis ==
The three main compounds that are used for producing terbufos are diethyl-phosphorodithioic acid, formaldehyde and tert-butylthiol. Formaldehyde acts as a carbon donor between the diethyl-phosphorodithioic acid and tert-butylthiol groups in order to link them. A secondary product of this reaction is water.

Synthesis of terbufos using diethylphosphorodithioate, formaldehyde and tert-butylthiol

== Mechanism of action ==
Terbufos, like other organophosphates, inactivates the acetylcholinesterase in humans by phosphorylation of the hydroxyl group of serine present at the active site of the enzyme.

== Metabolism ==
=== Metabolism in animals ===
The major excretion route of terbufos in lactating goats is via the urine. 96.0% and 86.9% of the administered compound was excreted through this route. Neither terbufos, nor a phosphorylated metabolite of the compound was found in milk, and no phosphorylated metabolite was detected in the tissues. A low concentration of terbufos was detected in the liver and the kidneys. Terbufos is extensively metabolised, judging from the low levels of terbufos and its metabolites detected in goat tissues. A proposed metabolism pathway of terbufos suggests a hydrolysis of the thiolophosphorus bond, an enzymatic S-methylation, desulfuration and sulfoxidation occurred in succession.

In rats, the proposed metabolism pathway includes more steps, while the metabolic product is the same as proposed in goats. The mechanism in rats includes extra steps in the metabolism of terbufos, and includes more metabolites.

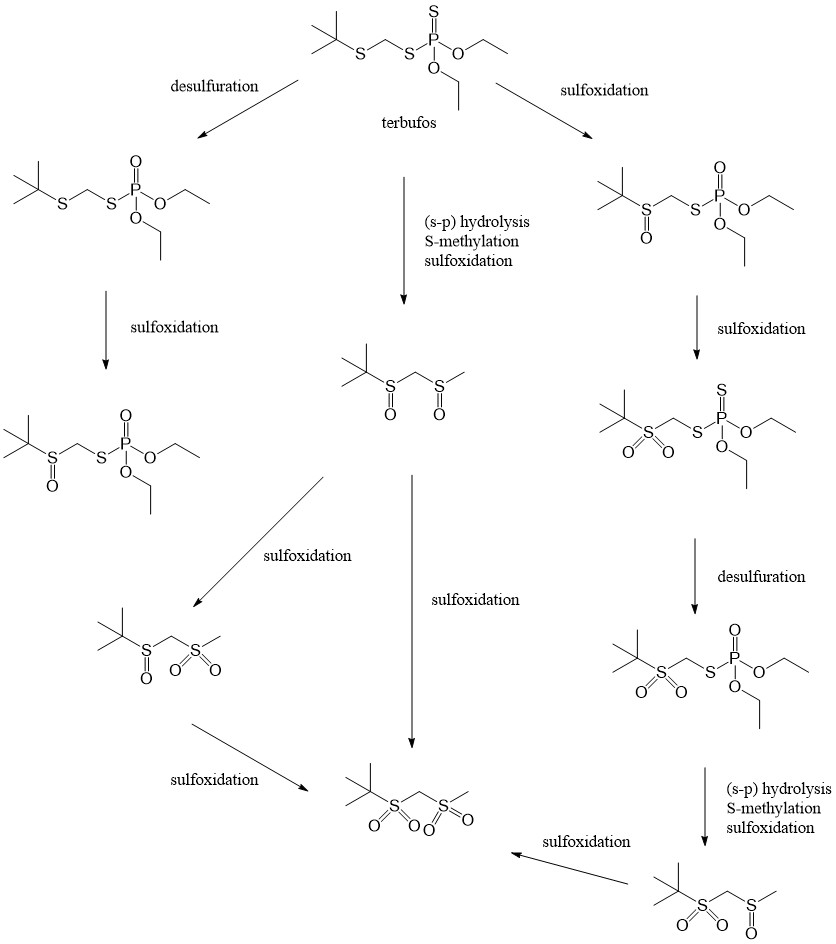
The metabolism of terbufos in goats

=== Biotransformation ===
Terbufos is activated by a biotransformation to a sulfone compound. This conversion can take place in the (cellular) environment but also in exposed organisms using the cytochrome P450 action. This conversion process makes the molecule much more efficient in binding with AChE. The converted form may be significantly more toxic to amphibians than the parent compound.

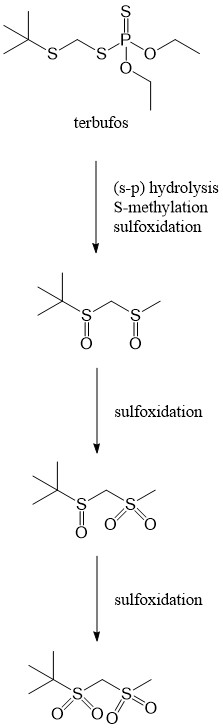
The biotransformation steps of terbufos into sulfone

== Toxicity ==
=== General toxicity ===
Terbufos can enter the body through dermal absorption (skin contact), inhalation or ingestion of the compound. Studies have suggested that the human NOEL ≥0.009 mg/m^3.

=== Metabolite toxicity ===
Two metabolites of terbufos have been tested for toxicity. Terbufos sulfoxide and terbufos sulfone both inhibited cholinesterase activity, but did not cause any mortalities in beagle dogs.

=== Health effects ===
==== Acute effects ====
Terbufos can induce death by causing an acute cholinergic crisis (ACC). Due to the irreversible inhibition of the AChE enzyme by the compound, acetylcholine (ACh) can no longer be sufficiently broken down by the AChE. This results in excess ACh, which causes overstimulation of the neuromuscular junction. The inhibiting effect of terbufos on AChE works on the peripheral muscarinic, nicotinic synapses and central nervous system. The onset of an ACC can vary from minutes to multiple hours post-exposure.

Symptoms of a terbufos induced ACC result in muscarinic (diaphoresis, vomiting, miosis, salivation), nicotinic (pallor and muscle weakness with respiratory failure) and CNS poisoning (headache, dizziness, altered level of consciousness) symptoms. The toxic effects can be managed by early recognition of terbufos poisoning, rapid decontamination and treatment with atropine or oxime compounds.

==== Long-term effects ====
Long term exposure effects which are specific for terbufos (effects generally associated with organophosphates (OPs) not included) are the development of lung cancer, leukemia and non-Hodgkin lymphoma (NHL) overall, as well as specific NHL subtypes. In males an increase in aggressive prostate cancer has also been observed, while in females a non-significant increase in breast cancer can be seen.

No genotoxic effects were detected in vitro and in vivo. No developmental abnormalities were noted in research, but a reduced fetal body weight was observed in mammals.

=== 2024 deaths in South Africa ===
Terbufos was identified as the cause of the deaths of 22 South African residents, including the highly publicised deaths of six children below the age of 10 from Naledi, Soweto. Though restricted for agricultural and not domestic usage in South Africa, terbufos and similar highly toxic substances are considered more effective than regulated options and can be found being sold by informal connivence stores, locally referred to as "spaza shops". As of January 2025, no link had been made between a specific shop and the deaths and the investigation had not determined whether the terbufos was locally produced or illegally imported.

Products containing terbufos were banned in South Africa in 2026.

== Detection ==
The amount of metabolites, caused by hydrolysis in vivo of an organophosphate compound such as terbufos, can be detected in the urine using gas chromatography and combined gas chromatography/mass spectrometry (GC-MC). Usually it is necessary to preserve the sample of the urine by addition of chloroform, to concentrate or extract the metabolites and to convert them to suitably-volatile derivatives. The detection can be useful to determine patterns of exposure. However, the levels of metabolite alone cannot be considered a guide to hazard.
