= Preemergent herbicide =

Class of herbicides

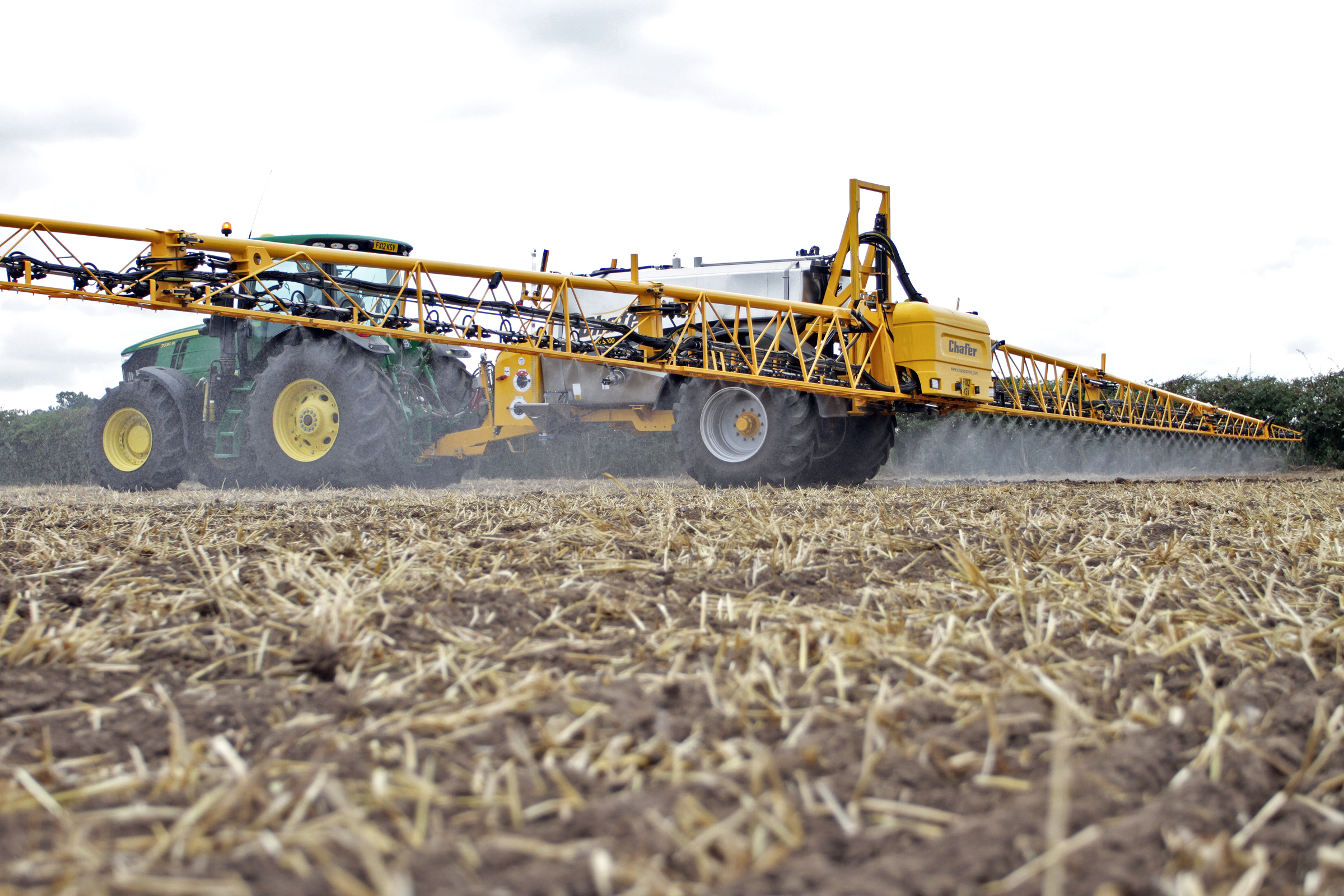
A pre-emergence spray of herbicide being added onto a field of oilseed rape.

Preemergent herbicides are a form of chemical weed control which prevent germinated weed seedlings from becoming established.

In some areas of the world, they are used to prevent crabgrass from appearing in lawns. Preemergent herbicides are applied to lawns in the spring and autumn, to prevent the establishment of weed seeds. They will not affect any established plant. In the spring, they should be applied when air temperatures reach 65–70 °F for four consecutive days. In the autumn, they should be applied when nighttime lows reach 55–60 °F for four consecutive nights.

"Weed and feed" products which contain both preemergent herbicide and fertilizer in a single product should not be used on southern lawns or warm-season grasses. If applied when preemergent herbicide is needed, the fertilizer may burn or stress the lawn. If applied after the lawn "green-up", weed seeds will have already germinated and the herbicide will be ineffective. Preemergants do not prevent seeds from germinating; they prevent cell division and prevent vital parts of the weed from forming.

== Brands ==
Brand	Ingredient	Prevents	Notes
Barricade	prodiamine	crabgrass	
Dimension	dithiopyr	crabgrass	
Dimension 750	dimethyl tetrachloroterephthalate		
Pendulum	pendimethalin	crabgrass	
Pestanal	dimethyl tetrachloroterephthalate		
Surflan	oryzalin	crabgrass	
Tupersan	siduron	crabgrass	

== Crabgrass ==
To prevent growth of crabgrass, preemergent herbicides must be applied at a critical time. If they are applied to the soil too early, they get washed too deep into the soil or washed away by rainwater. If they are applied too late, the key enzyme inhibited is no longer active. The best control requires a second application about 6–8 weeks later. This provides coverage in mid-late summer when crabgrass can still germinate. Depending on location, one suggestion is to apply when the local forsythia blooms are wilting. In the northeast, they need to be applied before azaleas bloom.
