= Dithiopyr =

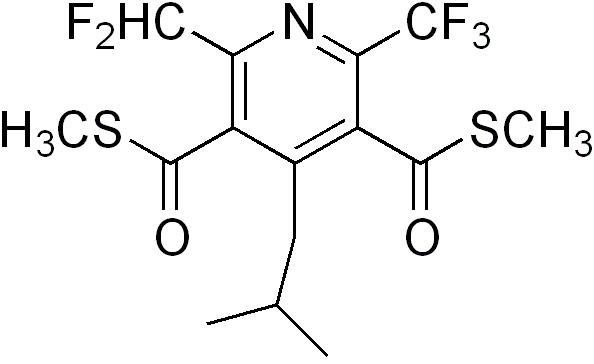

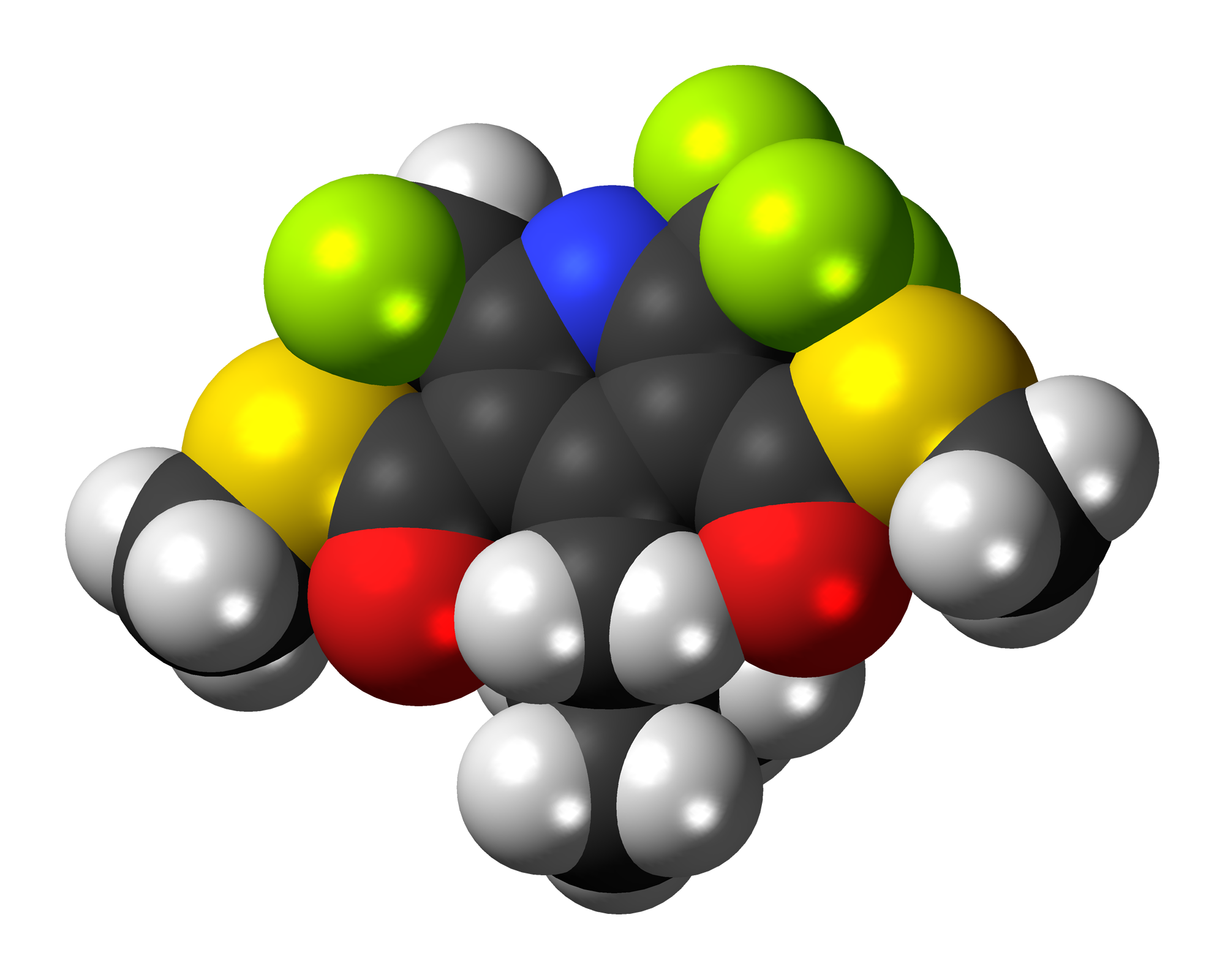

Names
- IUPAC name Dimethyl 2-(difluoromethyl)-4-(2-methylpropyl)-6-(trifluoromethyl)pyridine-3,5-dicarbothioate

Identifiers
CAS Number	97886-45-8
3D model (JSmol)	Interactive image
ChemSpider	82855
ECHA InfoCard	100.131.988
KEGG	C18826
PubChem CID	91757
UNII	2TXF17HAV1
CompTox Dashboard (EPA)	DTXSID9032379
- InChI: InChI=1S/C15H16F5NO2S2/c1-6(2)5-7-8(13(22)24-3)10(12(16)17)21-11(15(18,19)20)9(7)14(23)25-4/h6,12H,5H2,1-4H3 Key: YUBJPYNSGLJZPQ-UHFFFAOYSA-N; InChI=1/C15H16F5NO2S2/c1-6(2)5-7-8(13(22)24-3)10(12(16)17)21-11(15(18,19)20)9(7)14(23)25-4/h6,12H,5H2,1-4H3 Key: YUBJPYNSGLJZPQ-UHFFFAOYAT
- SMILES: FC(F)(F)c1nc(c(c(c1C(=O)SC)CC(C)C)C(=O)SC)C(F)F

Properties
Chemical formula	C_{15}H_{16}F_{5}NO_{2}S_{2}
Molar mass	401.42 g/mol
- Except where otherwise noted, data are given for materials in their standard state (at 25 °C [77 °F], 100 kPa). verify (what is ?) Infobox references

Dithiopyr is a preemergent herbicide for crabgrass control in turf and ornamental grasses. It is effective on 45 grassy and broadleaf weeds. Dithiopyr inhibits root growth of susceptible weeds as well as turf grass and thus should be used only on established turf with a well-developed root system. Its duration of efficacy is approximately 4 months, so lawns should not be reseeded during this time frame following application of the chemical. Dithiopyr acts primarily as a preemergent herbicide but can also be used in early postemergent control of crabgrass.

It is an ingredient in many products including Dimension from Dow AgroSciences.

== Mode of action ==
Dithiopyr acts as a root growth inhibitor, causing cessation of root elongation and inhibition of mitotic cell division. It inhibits formation of microtubules and spindle organizing centers. Dithiopyr may alter microtubule polymerization and stability by "interacting with microtubule associated proteins or microtubule organizing centers rather than interaction directly with tubulin." Mitotic cells are arrested in late prometaphase. Cell entry into mitosis is unaffected.

== Synthesis ==
Dithiopyr can be obtained through a multi-step process starting from ethyl trifluoroacetoacetate and isovaleraldehyde.
