= American Vanguard Corporation =

Agrochemical manufacturer

- Company type: Public company
- Traded as: NYSE: AVD
- Industry: Agrochemical
- Founded: 1967; 59 years ago
- Founders: Herbert A. Kraft and Glenn A. Wintemute
- Headquarters: Newport Beach, California, United States
- Area served: Worldwide
- Products: Agricultural chemicals including insecticides and fertilizers
- Number of employees: 845 (2023)
- Subsidiaries: AMVAC, AgNova, Agrinos, and AmGuard
- Website: www.american-vanguard.com

American Vanguard Corporation, through its subsidiary AMVAC Chemical Corporation, is an American producer of agrochemicals and pesticide delivery systems.

The company was founded by Herbert A. Kraft and Glenn A. Wintemute, with the latter stepping down as president in 1994 and his son Eric Wintemute taking over as chairman and chief executive officer.

The company operates factories in Los Angeles and Axis, Alabama. American Vanguard trades on the New York Stock Exchange (NYSE) under the ticker symbol "AVD."

Products have included dichlorvos (DDVP), metam sodium, mevinphos, pentachloronitrobenzene (PCNB) and terbufos.

== History ==
The company was founded in 1969 as a regional agrichemicals manufacturer in the United States. In 1971, it acquired Durham Chemical and formed the AMVAC subsidiary. In 1989 it acquired DuPont Phosdrin.

In 1991, over 19,000 gallons of metam sodium manufactured by Amvac Chemical Corporation spilled from a train derailment into Shasta Lake. AMVAC settled resulting lawsuits for $2 million while Southern Pacific Transportation Company paid $30 million in settlements.

In 2001, AMVAC began producing the herbicide DCPA (Dimethyl tetrachloroterephthalate, trade name Dacthal) for the American market.

In 2007, Amvac paid $300,000 in a pre-trial settlement with six workers who were exposed to dibromochloropropane (DBCP) on a Dole Food Company-operated banana plantation in the 1970s.

In 2017, the company acquired the US rights to abamectin, Chlorothalonil, and paraquat from ADAMA Agricultural Solutions.

In 2018, the company acquired the US and Canada Bromacil business from Bayer Crop Science.

In August 2024, the Environmental Protection Agency (EPA) issued an emergency order to immediately remove DCPA from the market.
