= Spaza shop =

Informal convenience shop in South Africa

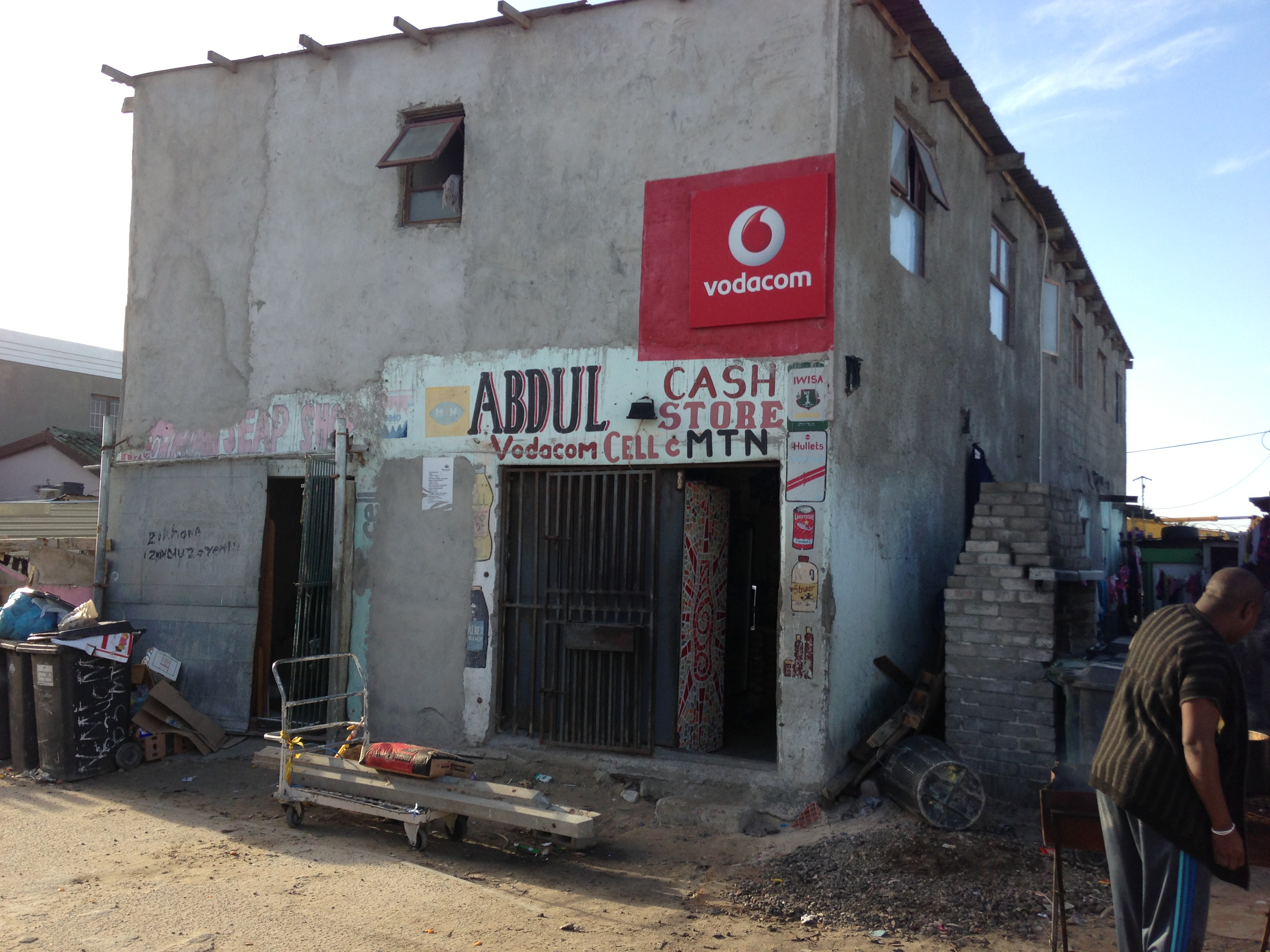
Spaza shop in Joe Slovo Park, Cape Town

Spaza shops, also known as tuck shops, originated in Apartheid-era South Africa when enterprising historically disadvantaged individuals were restricted from owning formal businesses, they began setting up informal, micro-convenience shops from their homes to serve their communities' daily needs in the townships. Linguists and researchers note a connection to the Zulu and Xhosa words isiphazamiso or isiphazamisa, meaning something that causes a "disturbance" or "hindrance".

== Unregulated Transformation ==
Since 1994, these shops have continued to develop in popularity and necessity along with the sprawling townships where people live long distances from the more expensive, formal shopping areas. They have expanded their offerings to include a variety of goods, from small furniture items to toiletries, and even some electronics.

South African banks are trying to win spaza shops as "bank shops" offering minimal banking services at lower costs than full bank branch offices. The link to the bank's back office is mostly via mobile phone based mobile banking.

== Continental Migration ==
With the fall of apartheid came an inflow of migrants from across the continent, seeing many undocumented Ethiopian and Somali asylum-seekers coming to South Africa and opening spaza shops, creating tension between local and foreign micro-entrepreneurs. South Africa received 778,000 asylum applications between 2008 and 2012 alone and now more than 60% of spaza shops in townships today are run by foreign nationals. This tense situation between shopkeepers and local residents is helping to drive a culture of xenophobia and social conflict.

== Food poisoning epidemic ==
In September 2024, there were 890 reported incidents of food-borne illnesses and spaza shops were identified by President Cyril Ramaphosa as being responsible. Pesticides and organophosphates such as Terbufos and Aldicarb were found to contribute to some of deaths.

On 15 November 2024, all spaza shops were told they had 21 days to register with their local municipality. Those shops which were implicated in 22 children's deaths were shut down. The South African Informal Traders Alliance (SAITA) agreed that the issue of food safety was vital;, however, the root causes were that the City of Johannesburg had cut budgets and neglected health inspections. Government regulations pertaining to the Foodstuffs, Cosmetics and Disinfectants act (1972) had not been followed or enforced. Health inspections had not been a priority for all levels of government. Spaza shop owners were instructed to register for a trading permit. Deadline dates for registration was supposed to be 13 December. Confusion about registration deadline has emerged and the government has apologized for the misunderstanding. Final registration dates was announced as 17 December 2024. By this date 43,000 applications had been received and approximately 19,300 approved. On the 18th of December, the deadline for Spaza shop registration was extended to the 28th of February 2025.
