= Isoxathion =

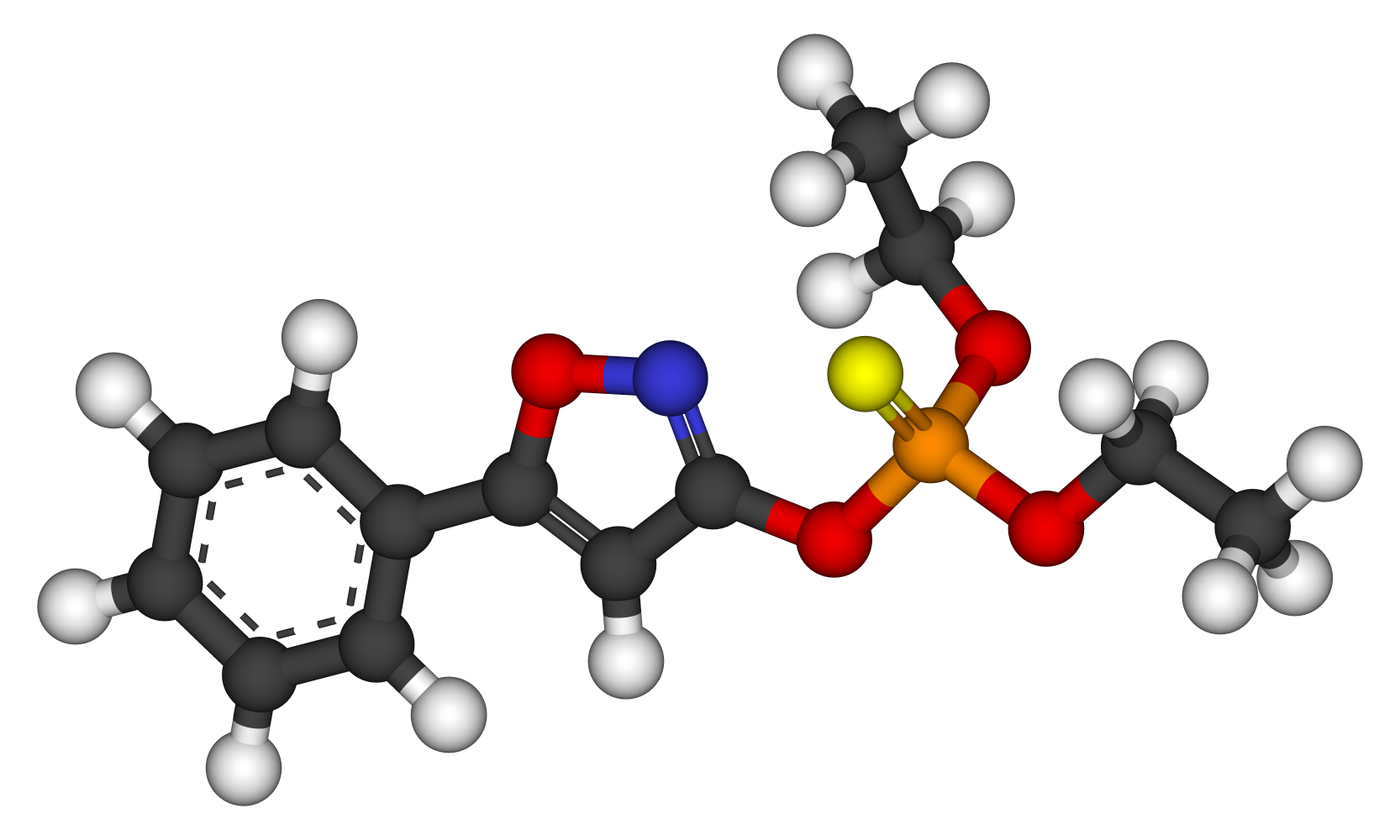

Names
- Preferred IUPAC name O,O-Diethyl O-(5-phenyl-1,2-oxazol-3-yl) phosphorothioate
- Other names O,O-Diethyl O-(5-phenyl-3-isoxazolyl) phosphorothioate

Identifiers
CAS Number	18854-01-8
3D model (JSmol)	Interactive image
ChEBI	CHEBI:34801
ChemSpider	27255
ECHA InfoCard	100.038.734
KEGG	C14580
PubChem CID	29307
UNII	IRA3YFG6CX
CompTox Dashboard (EPA)	DTXSID0042080
- InChI: InChI=1S/C13H16NO4PS/c1-3-15-19(20,16-4-2)18-13-10-12(17-14-13)11-8-6-5-7-9-11/h5-10H,3-4H2,1-2H3 Key: SDMSCIWHRZJSRN-UHFFFAOYSA-N; InChI=1/C13H16NO4PS/c1-3-15-19(20,16-4-2)18-13-10-12(17-14-13)11-8-6-5-7-9-11/h5-10H,3-4H2,1-2H3 Key: SDMSCIWHRZJSRN-UHFFFAOYAE
- SMILES: S=P(Oc2noc(c1ccccc1)c2)(OCC)OCC

Properties
Chemical formula	C_{13}H_{16}NO_{4}PS
Molar mass	313.31 g/mol
Appearance	Yellowish liquid
- Except where otherwise noted, data are given for materials in their standard state (at 25 °C [77 °F], 100 kPa). verify (what is ?) Infobox references

Isoxathion is a chemical compound with the molecular formula C_{13}H_{16}NO_{4}PS. It is an insecticide, specifically an isoxazole organothiophosphate insecticide.
