= Dimethyl tetrachloroterephthalate =

Banned chlorinated herbicide

Names
- Preferred IUPAC name Dimethyl 2,3,5,6-tetrachlorobenzene-1,4-dicarboxylate
- Other names Chlorthal-dimethyl; Dimethyl 2,3,5,6-tetrachloroterephthalate

Identifiers
CAS Number	1861-32-1
3D model (JSmol)	Interactive image
ChEBI	CHEBI:34664
ChEMBL	ChEMBL1888079
ChemSpider	2839
ECHA InfoCard	100.015.877
EC Number	217-464-7
KEGG	C14744
PubChem CID	2943
UNII	ZU3X5G2QLR
CompTox Dashboard (EPA)	DTXSID0024000
- InChI: InChI=1S/C10H6Cl4O4/c1-17-9(15)3-5(11)7(13)4(10(16)18-2)8(14)6(3)12/h1-2H3 Key: NPOJQCVWMSKXDN-UHFFFAOYSA-N
- SMILES: Clc1c(C(=O)OC)c(Cl)c(Cl)c(C(=O)OC)c1Cl

Properties
Chemical formula	C_{10}H_{6}Cl_{4}O_{4}
Molar mass	331.95 g·mol^{−1}
Appearance	Colourless to grey crystalline powder
Density	1.56
Melting point	156 °C (313 °F; 429 K)
Boiling point	345 °C (653 °F; 618 K)
Solubility in water	0.21 mg/L (20 °C)
log P	4.28
Vapor pressure	0.21 mPa (2.5 × 10^{−6} Torr)

Hazards
- Occupational safety and health (OHS/OSH)
Main hazards	Reproductive toxicant
NFPA 704 (fire diamond)	1 1 0
Flash point	Nonflammable
Autoignition temperature	N/A
- Lethal dose or concentration (LD, LC)
LD_{50} (median dose)	>10000 mg/kg
- Except where otherwise noted, data are given for materials in their standard state (at 25 °C [77 °F], 100 kPa). Infobox references

Dimethyl tetrachloroterephthalate (DCPA, with the main trade name Dacthal) is an organic compound with the formula C_{6}Cl_{4}(CO_{2}CH_{3})_{2}. It is the dimethyl ester of tetrachloroterephthalic acid, used as a preemergent herbicide with the ISO common name chlorthal-dimethyl. It kills annual grasses and many common weeds without killing sensitive plants such as turf grasses, flowers, fruits, vegetables, and cotton.

DCPA was first registered for use in the United States in 1958, for use on turf grasses, for the control of annual grasses such as crabgrass, and certain annual broad-leaved weeds. Production of DCPA was eventually discontinued by ISK Biosciences in 1998, but the large manufacturing company AMVAC (American Vanguard Corporation) began producing the product in 2001 for use in America. In Australia, DCPA is the active ingredient in agchem company Farmalinx's herbicide called Dynamo 750.

EPA registration for use on vegetable crops was voluntarily terminated by the manufacturer in 2005 in response to EPA concerns regarding the contamination of groundwater. In 2009, DCPA was banned for use on crops in the European Union. On August 6, 2024 the United States Environmental Protection Agency announced the emergency suspension of all registrations of the pesticide in the United States due to concerns regarding embryo-fetal toxicity According to the EPA, when pregnant mothers are exposed to DCPA their babies could experience changes to hormone levels, and these changes are generally linked to symptoms such as low birth weight, impaired brain development, decreased IQ, and impaired motor skills later in life, some of which may be irreversible.

== Synthesis ==
The use of DCPA as a herbicide was first described in a patent filed in 1958. The material was prepared as had been described in a 1948 research paper by treating terephthaloyl chloride with chlorine to give tetrachloroterephthaloyl chloride which was then esterified with methanol.

C_{6}H_{4}(COCl)_{2} + 4 Cl_{2} + Fe (cat.) → C_{6}Cl_{4}(COCl)_{2}
C_{6}Cl_{4}(COCl)_{2} + 2 CH_{3}OH → C_{6}Cl_{4}(CO_{2}CH_{3})_{2}

== Contamination ==
DCPA is released directly into the environment during its use as a herbicide. DCPA exists in both the vapor and particulate phases when exposed to the air. In the vapor phase, DCPA should react slowly with hydroxyl radicals with an estimated half-life of 36 days. Particulate-phase DCPA may be physically removed from air by wet and dry deposition. With a high Koc of 3900, DCPA is presumably immobile in soil, and thus may strongly attach to inorganic material in soil and other environments.

In addition, its breakdown products, TPA (Tetrachloroterephthalic acid) and MTP (Monomethyl tetrachloroterephthalic acid), enter the environment after being formed through various processes. Studies have shown that DCPA can partially degrade through volatilization, as well as via photodegradation, but biodegradation is the primary route of DCPA degradation leading to MTP and TPA. Environmental Protection Agency testing in New York showed "measurable residues of DCPA and degradates" on land that had endured five years of treatment with DCPA, followed by three years of no treatment. DCPA is also prevalent in water and bioconcentration is seen in aquatic animals. DCPA accumulation was shown in fish at "several locations" in the United States. Some of these locations included the Apalachicola, Colorado, Mobile, Savannah, and Pee Dee River Basins in both bass and carp. In the study done on these river basin locations, roughly 39% of the fish tested had stored DCPA concentrations that exceeded their limit of detection, and the male fish had higher stored concentrations of DCPA than their female counterparts. Fish collected from different locations throughout the United States are often contaminated by DCPA if they are near agricultural areas that use or have used it as an herbicide.

Humans are exposed to DCPA through drinking well water, eating fish, and eating leafy and root vegetables. In some areas where agriculture is prominent, inhalation of air can be a means of exposure.

== Degradation and metabolism ==
DCPA

MTP

TPA

Dimethyl tetrachloroterephthalate and two stages of degradation

DCPA degrades via successive hydrolysis of the two ester linkages, first forming monomethyl tetrachloroterephthalate (MTP) then further to tetrachloroterephthalic acid (TPA). Following ingestion, TPA is formed in tissues during the metabolism of DCPA.

In the presence of sunlight, the half-life for DCPA floating on the surface of water is less than three days. In soil, the half-life in the presence of sunlight ranges from 14 to 100 days.

=== Properties of Degradates ===
TPA and MTP are both more water-soluble than DCPA, and readily leach into groundwater wherever DCPA is used, regardless of soil composition. TPA has been observed to cause weight loss and diarrhea in laboratory rats, the same symptoms caused by DCPA, but at lower doses than necessary for DCPA. TPA does not degrade, and infiltrates soil and nearby water sources. The accumulation of TPA and its salts in areas where DCPA is widely used has prompted research on TPA, although no carcinogenicity studies have been conducted yet. There have been no standard toxicity studies identified for MTP.

== Toxicology ==
DCPA is listed as a Group C Possible Human Carcinogen by the National Library of Medicine.

Studies show that DCPA and TPA may cause detrimental health effects in laboratory animals, mainly weight loss and diarrhea occurring at doses near 2000 mg/kg/day. There were also effects on the lungs, liver, kidney, and thyroid glands of male and female rats. The LD50, or 50% lethal dose of DCPA, is greater than 10,000 mg/kg in beagle dogs. In humans, it seems that DCPA is poorly absorbed, as 6% of a 25-mg dose and 12% of a 50-mg dose were absorbed according to metabolites in urine. Decreased motor activity and poor sight reflexes were also observed in a study on New Zealand white rabbits that were exposed to DCPA. Exposure from DCPA to pregnant rats resulted in reduced body weight in both mother and pup, as well as changes to the thyroid in pups. Additionally, rats whose mothers were exposed to DCPA during pregnancy had impaired higher-level learning test scores than those whose mothers were not exposed. Studies regarding the carcinogenicity of DCPA have produced mixed results. A study by ISK Biotech Corp. in 1993 showed DCPA leading to thyroid tumors in male and female rats, and liver tumors in female rats. Alternatively, a 1963 study using pure DCPA did not produce any negative results when administered to albino rats.

Studies have demonstrated that DCPA acts as a chemical disruptor by interfering with microtubule formation in exposed cells. This interference results in abnormal cell division. The abnormal microtubules affect cell wall formation as well as chromosome replication and division. The key difference between DCPA and other mitotic inhibitors is that it often produces multinucleate cells. It essentially kills plants by inhibiting cell division in this manner.

Exposure to DCPA has shown damaging effects in the adrenal glands, kidneys, livers, thyroids, and spleens of laboratory animals. The effects on the rabbits included decreased motor activity and poor reflexes.

According to the US EPA, when pregnant mothers are exposed to DCPA their babies could experience changes to hormone levels, and these changes are generally linked to symptoms like low birth weight, impaired brain development, decreased IQ, and impaired motor skills, which may be irreversible and lifelong.

== Regulation ==
=== Australia ===
Products containing DCPA had their registration cancelled and usage banned by the APVMA on 10 October 2024. Before this, one use of dacthal was on baseball fields.

=== Europe ===
DCPA has been prohibited for use on crops in the European Union since 2009.

=== United States ===
In the U.S. The Safe Drinking Water Act of 1996 has the U.S. EPA publish a list of contaminants referred to as the Contaminant Candidate List to assist in research efforts. The Safe Drinking Water Act also calls for the EPA to choose five contaminants from the list and determine whether regulation is necessary. In July 2008, the EPA determined that no regulatory action is necessary for DCPA mono-acid (MTP) degradate and DCPA di-acid (TPA) degradate. After multiple studies, it was determined that degradates of DCPA appear too infrequently to pose a serious health risk so the government does not regulate DCPA or its degradates in drinking water. Public water systems are also not required to monitor DCPA, MTP, or TPA. There are standards set by some states ranging from 0.17 µg/L to 2 µg/L.

Some uses of DCPA, particularly on vegetable crops, were voluntarily terminated by the registrant in 2005, in response to the EPA's concerns regarding DCPA and TPA contamination of groundwater.

In California, DCPA products are required to be labeled with information that states that products with DCPA also contain trace amounts of Hexachlorobenzene (HCB) which is a chemical known to the State of California to cause cancer or birth defects.

On August 6, 2024 the United States Environmental Protection Agency announced the emergency suspension of all registrations of this pesticide in the United States due to embryo-fetal toxicity concerns. This was the first time in almost 40 years that the EPA had taken this type of emergency action. “DCPA is so dangerous that it needs to be removed from the market immediately,” said Assistant Administrator for the Office of Chemical Safety and Pollution Prevention Michal Freedhoff.
