= Encyprate =

MAOI antidepressant

Clinical data
- Other names: MO-1255

Identifiers
- IUPAC name: ethyl N-benzyl-N-cyclopropylcarbamate
- CAS Number: 2521-01-9
- PubChem CID: 17298
- ChemSpider: 16368
- UNII: 26991ZCA4G
- KEGG: D03993
- ChEMBL: ChEMBL2104204
- CompTox Dashboard (EPA): DTXSID90179870
- ECHA InfoCard: 100.209.661

Chemical and physical data
- Formula: C_{13}H_{17}NO_{2}
- Molar mass: 219.284 g·mol^{−1}
- 3D model (JSmol): Interactive image
- SMILES: CCOC(=O)N(CC1=CC=CC=C1)C2CC2
- InChI: InChI=1S/C13H17NO2/c1-2-16-13(15)14(12-8-9-12)10-11-6-4-3-5-7-11/h3-7,12H,2,8-10H2,1H3; Key:OGXBVBBMMWSZJO-UHFFFAOYSA-N

Encyprate is a monoamine oxidase inhibitor (MAOI) agent that was developed for use in the treatment of depression. It is an irreversible inhibitor of the MAO enzyme because it is agent that can form covalent bonds with the active site. As such, it is sometimes referred to as a “suicide inactivator” of MAO. It was invented by Bruce Horrom of Abbott in the 1960s by structure activity studies on pargyline. Although it is not known to have ever been used in the clinic, it is an example of the heritage of agents that were developed at that time.

== Synthesis ==
Encyprate synthesis

The condensation between cyclopropylamine [765-30-0] (1) and benzaldehyde [100-52-7] (2) gives N-benzylidenecyclopropylamine [3187-77-7] (3). The reduction of the Schiff-base gives N-benzylcyclopropylamine [13324-66-8] (4). Urethane formation with ethyl chloroformate [541-41-3] (5) completes the synthesis of encyprate (6).
