= Noruron =

Names
- Preferred IUPAC name rac-N,N-dimethyl-N'-[(3aR,4S,5R,7S,7aR)-octahydro-1H-4,7-methanoinden-5-yl]urea
- Other names: Norea; 1,1-dimethyl-3-[(1S,2R,6R,7S,8R)-8-tricyclo[5.2.1.02,6]decanyl]urea; N,N-Dimethyl-N′-(octahydro-4,7-methano-1H-inden-5-yl)urea; l-5-(3a,4,5,6,7,7ahexahydro-4, 7 -methanoindanyl-3 ,3-dimethylurea

Identifiers
| CAS Number | 18530-56-8 |
| 3D model (JSmol) | Interactive image |
| ChemSpider | 32697651 |
| ECHA InfoCard | 100.038.536 |
| EC Number | 242-406-2 |
| PubChem CID | 12313523 |
| UNII | 4Z7VLM178S |
| CompTox Dashboard (EPA) | DTXSID6040292 |
- InChI: InChI=1S/C13H22N2O/c1-15(2)13(16)14-12-7-8-6-11(12)10-5-3-4-9(8)10/h8-12H,3-7H2,1-2H3,(H,14,16) Key: YGLMVCVJLXREAK-UHFFFAOYSA-N
- SMILES: O=C(NC1CC2CC1C3CCCC23)N(C)C

Properties
| Chemical formula | C_{13}H_{22}N_{2}O |
| Molar mass | 222.332 g·mol^{−1} |
| Density | 1100 kg/m^{3} |
| Melting point | 177 °C (351 °F; 450 K) |
| Solubility in water | 194 mg/L |

Hazards
- GHS labelling
| Pictograms | (GHS07: Exclamation mark) |
| Signal word | Warning |
| Hazard statements | H302, H311 |
| Precautionary statements | P264, P280, P312, P321, P361+P364, P501 |
- Lethal dose or concentration (LD, LC)
| LD_{50} (median dose) | 2000 mg/kg (rat, oral); 723 mg/kg (rabbit, dermal) |
- Except where otherwise noted, data are given for materials in their standard state (at 25 °C [77 °F], 100 kPa). Infobox references

Noruron (or norea) is a preëmergent urea herbicide active ingredient. It is considered obsolete, but may still be used. Introduced in the US in 1962, was used to control grass weeds and broadleaf weeds on crops including broomcorn, cotton, potatoes, sugarcane, spinach, soybeans and sorghum.

== Legal Status ==
Noruron is not approved for use in the EU.

== Chemistry ==
Noruron is stereochemically racemic, with 5 stereocenters. It is a chiral molecule, and the technical grade stuff is mixed from two racemates.

== Application ==
Noruron is applied at 0.75 to 4 kg/ha of active ingredient, typically supplied as wettable powder or granules.

=== Performance ===
Norea (in conifer seedbeds in Connecticut) provided fair to excellent weed control for two months, at 1.5 to 2 lbs/ac (1.68 to 2.24 kg/Ha), with injury to pine and spruce seedlings in most tests, though at 4 lbs/ac it injured white pine. Norea's control was comparable to simazine but shorter-lasting.

A 1960s trial found noruron promising for growing dioscorea crops (such as yams), as of the tested herbicides it showed the most control without causing crop-injury.

== Products ==
It has been sold under the tradename "Herban", a 76% norea wettable powder. "Daban-1", "Maban-2" were liquid formulations containing 1 lb per gallon Herban. Maban was registered in 1967 and discontinued in 1989. Herban was trademarked in 1963, renewed in 1983, but expired in 2004.

Maban was registered for use on cotton, drainage ditch banks, fencerows, noncrop areas, rights-of-way, and storage yards.
