= Butamifos =

Identifiers
| CAS Number | 36335-67-8 |
| 3D model (JSmol) | Interactive image |
| ChemSpider | 34329 |
| ECHA InfoCard | 100.126.299 |
| EC Number | 609-231-7 |
| KEGG | C11022 |
| PubChem CID | 37419 |
| UNII | KHP91X76U4 |
| CompTox Dashboard (EPA) | DTXSID5058068 |
- InChI: InChI=1S/C13H21N2O4PS/c1-5-11(4)14-20(21,18-6-2)19-13-9-10(3)7-8-12(13)15(16)17/h7-9,11H,5-6H2,1-4H3,(H,14,21) Key: OEYOMNZEMCPTKN-UHFFFAOYSA-N
- SMILES: CCC(C)NP(=S)(OCC)OC1=C(C=CC(=C1)C)[N+](=O)[O-]

Properties
| Chemical formula | C_{13}H_{21}N_{2}O_{4}PS |
| Molar mass | 332.35 g·mol^{−1} |

Hazards
- GHS labelling
| Pictograms | (GHS07: Exclamation mark) (GHS09: Environmental hazard) |
| Signal word | Warning |
| Hazard statements | H302, H410 |
| Precautionary statements | P264, P270, P273, P301+P317, P330, P391, P501 |
- Except where otherwise noted, data are given for materials in their standard state (at 25 °C [77 °F], 100 kPa). Infobox references

Butamifos is an herbicide that is used to control weeds.

== Production ==
The production of butamifos is based on N-[chloro(ethoxy)phosphinothioyl]butan-2-amine and 5-methyl-2-nitrophenol and is described in the following reaction sequence:

Synthesis of butamifos

== Properties ==
Butamifos is a chiral molecule. The technical product uses a mixture of the (R)- and (S)-isomers.

In a study, the level of pesticide contamination in soil and water of an agriculturally intensive area in Nepal was investigated. Endosulfan, Iprobefos, monocrotophos, mevinphos, and butamifos were detected in water samples, while cypermethrin, dichlorvos, and cyfluthrin were detected in soil samples. The increased concentration of butamifos in water may be due to higher water solubility and lower affinity for adsorption in soil.

== Use ==
=== Application and mode of action ===
Butamifos is used on beans, turf and various vegetables. The active ingredient is a non-systemic, selective herbicide. Its effect is based on inhibition of microtubule formation. It also acts as an acetylcholinesterase inhibitor, making it moderately toxic to mammals.

=== Trade name ===
A crop protection product containing the active ingredient butamifos is marketed under the trade name Cremart.

=== Registration ===
No plant protection products containing butamifos are registered in the European Union or Switzerland.
