= Prodiamine =

Weed control herbicide

Names
- Preferred IUPAC name 2,6-Dinitro-N^{1},N^{1}-dipropyl-4-(trifluoromethyl)benzene-1,3-diamine
- Other names: Prodiamina (Polish); BRN 2181386; USB 3153

Identifiers
CAS Number	29091-21-2
3D model (JSmol)	Interactive image
ChEBI	CHEBI:82032
ChEMBL	ChEMBL1223140
ChemSpider	31719
ECHA InfoCard	100.044.914
EC Number	249-421-3
KEGG	C18884
PubChem CID	34469
UNII	IJI5J414Q6
CompTox Dashboard (EPA)	DTXSID1034210
- InChI: InChI=1S/C13H17F3N4O4/c1-3-5-18(6-4-2)11-9(19(21)22)7-8(13(14,15)16)10(17)12(11)20(23)24/h7H,3-6,17H2,1-2H3 Key: RSVPPPHXAASNOL-UHFFFAOYSA-N
- SMILES: CCCN(CCC)C1=C(C=C(C(=C1[N+](=O)[O-])N)C(F)(F)F)[N+](=O)[O-]

Properties
Chemical formula	C_{13}H_{17}F_{3}N_{4}O_{4}
Molar mass	350.298 g·mol^{−1}
Appearance	Yellow powder
Density	1410 kg/m^{3}
Melting point	124–125 °C (255–257 °F; 397–398 K)
Boiling point	N/A, degrades at 240°C
Solubility in water	0.013 mg/L
Solubility in acetone	226 g/L
Solubility in benzene	74 g/L
Solubility in ethanol	7 g/L
Solubility in xylene	35.4 g/L
Vapor pressure	0.0033 mPa

Hazards
- Occupational safety and health (OHS/OSH)
Main hazards	Skin & eye irritant
- GHS labelling
Pictograms	(GHS07: Exclamation mark) (GHS09: Environmental hazard)
Signal word	Warning
Hazard statements	H332, H410
Precautionary statements	P261, P271, P273, P304+P312, P304+P340, P312, P391, P501
- Except where otherwise noted, data are given for materials in their standard state (at 25 °C [77 °F], 100 kPa). Infobox references

Prodiamine is a preëmergent herbicide of the dinitroaniline class. Prodiamine is used with crops such as soybeans, alfalfa, cotton, and ornamental crops. Prodiamine inhibits the formation of microtubules, making it a Group D (Aus), K1 (global) or 3 (numeric).

Prodiamine was developed by Sandoz AG and marketed beginning in 1987. Prodiamine can be obtained starting from 2,4-dichlorobenzotrifluoride. It is normally sold formulated as dispersible granules or liquid concentrate. It is not registered in the United Kingdom or European Union, though it is used in Australia, sold under the "Spartan" and "Barricade" trademarks.

Prodiamine is surface applied, and requires no soil incorporation.

== Toxicity and environmental behaviour ==
Prodiamine is practically non-toxic to mammals, with an oral LD_{50} of over 5000 mg/kg (tested on rats). No observable effect exists for rats fed up to 6 mg/kg/day. For birds, the LD_{50} is over 2250 mg/kg, for bees, over 100 micrograms per bee, and for earthworms over 1000 mg/kg. These values are not tested beyond there, as they already show the acute toxicity not to be a concern.

Prodiamine has moderate aquatic toxicity, with a 96-hour LC_{50} of 0.829 mg/L for rainbow trout, and a NOEL of 12 μg/L over 21 days. It has a similar acute toxicity to daphnia, though a higher NOEL of 23 μg/L. The LC_{50} is better for crustaceans, at 2.1 mg/L. Prodiamine is highly toxic to algae, halting growth at 3 μg/L.

In soil, prodiamine has a half-life of 60 to 80 days by most estimates, except the EPA which states 120 days. It is non-mobile in soil, and unlikely to bioaccumulate.
