= Lenacil =

Herbicide

- Skeletal formula of Lenacil

Names
- Preferred IUPAC name 3-cyclohexyl-1,5,6,7-tetrahydrocyclopenta[d]pyrimidine-2,4-dione

Identifiers
CAS Number	2164-08-1
3D model (JSmol)	Interactive image
ChEBI	CHEBI:6407
ChEMBL	ChEMBL1522462
ChemSpider	15699
ECHA InfoCard	100.016.818
EC Number	218-499-0
KEGG	C11200
PubChem CID	16559
UNII	X58DK6S8KX
CompTox Dashboard (EPA)	DTXSID9042093
- InChI: InChI=1S/C13H18N2O2/c16-12-10-7-4-8-11(10)14-13(17)15(12)9-5-2-1-3-6-9/h9H,1-8H2,(H,14,17) Key: ZTMKADLOSYKWCA-UHFFFAOYSA-N
- SMILES: C1CCC(CC1)N2C(=O)C3=C(CCC3)NC2=O

Properties
Chemical formula	C_{13}H_{18}N_{2}O_{2}
Molar mass	234.299 g·mol^{−1}
Density	1.32 g/cm^{3}
Melting point	315.6 to 316.8 °C (600.1 to 602.2 °F; 588.8 to 590.0 K)
Solubility in water	6 mg/L (25 °C)

Hazards
- GHS labelling
Pictograms	(GHS08: Health hazard) (GHS09: Environmental hazard)
Signal word	Warning
Hazard statements	H351, H410
Precautionary statements	P203, P273, P280, P318, P391, P405, P501
- Except where otherwise noted, data are given for materials in their standard state (at 25 °C [77 °F], 100 kPa). Infobox references

Lenacil is a uracil-derived chemical herbicide used to control broadleaf weeds.

== Production and synthesis ==
Lenacil was first patented and manufactured by DuPont in the 1960s.

The compound can be produced via a condensation reaction between ethyl-2-oxocyclopentanecarboxylate (the Dieckmann condensation product of diethyl adipate) and cyclohexylurea under an environment of phosphoric acid:

== Uses ==
Lenacil is used in the agricultural industry as a selective herbicide to protect sugar and fodder beets.

Lenacil's HRAC classification is Group C1, Group C (global, Australia) or Group 5 (numeric), as it inhibits photosynthesis at photosystem II.

== Toxicity ==
Lenacil is noted as a potential endocrine disrupting compound. It is not acutely toxic or genotoxic to mammals, though there is limited evidence the compound is carcinogenic. Lenacil is noted as particularly damaging to algae and aquatic plants, which is a concern if the compound leaches into groundwater when used as a pesticide.
