= Carfentrazone =

Herbicide introduced in 1997

Names
- IUPAC name 2-Chloro-3-[2-chloro-5-[4-(difluoromethyl)-3-methyl-5-oxo-1,2,4-triazol-1-yl]-4-fluorophenyl]propanoic acid

Identifiers
CAS Number	128621-72-7
3D model (JSmol)	Interactive image
ChEBI	CHEBI:138240
ChemSpider	391493
ECHA InfoCard	100.127.279
EC Number	603-289-7
KEGG	C11493
PubChem CID	443229
UNII	WAH5515N4U
CompTox Dashboard (EPA)	DTXSID10869766
- InChI: InChI=1S/C13H10Cl2F3N3O3/c1-5-19-21(13(24)20(5)12(17)18)10-3-6(2-8(15)11(22)23)7(14)4-9(10)16/h3-4,8,12H,2H2,1H3,(H,22,23) Key: YHKBGVDUSSWOAB-UHFFFAOYSA-N
- SMILES: CC1=NN(C(=O)N1C(F)F)C2=C(C=C(C(=C2)CC(C(=O)O)Cl)Cl)F

Properties
Chemical formula	C_{13}H_{10}Cl_{2}F_{3}N_{3}O_{3}
Molar mass	384.14 g·mol^{−1}
- Except where otherwise noted, data are given for materials in their standard state (at 25 °C [77 °F], 100 kPa). Infobox references

Carfentrazone is an aryl-triazoline herbicide, used for pre-crop-establishment control of broadleaf weeds, including marshmallow, annual nettles, and volunteer cotton, and frequently in tank mixtures with knock-down herbicides, such as glyphosate. Under the system of HRAC classification it is a Group 14 (numeric), E (global) or G (Australian), since it acts by membrane disruption, through the inhibition of protoporphyrinogen oxidase. Carfentrazone is used on crops, fallows, forest plantations, industrial, horticultural and commercial areas.

Carfentrazone is used in Australia, the United Kingdom, the European Union, the United States and India. It was introduced in 1997. It was registered first in Australia in 2014 by 4Farmers Ltd, as a 240 g/L emulsifiable concentrate.

== Mechanism and effects ==
Affected weeds rapidly absorb carfentrazone through foliage, and show symptoms within hours, of desiccation, necrosis and death. It is often applied at 75 mL/ha in Australia, or less if part of a knockdown mixture with glyphosate, due to carfentrazone's prevention of weeds' metabolism, which reduces the translocation and effectiveness of glyphosate. Effectiveness is best when applied with much water, and reduced by muddy or saline mix-water.

== Safety ==
Carfentrazone is toxic to aquatic life, both in acute and chronic toxicities. In mammals, carfentrazone has a low toxicity, with an LD_{50} of over 5000 mg/kg, tested orally in rats. For birds, carfentrazone is also of low toxicity.

== Links ==
- Carfentrazone in the Pesticide Properties DataBase (PPDB)
