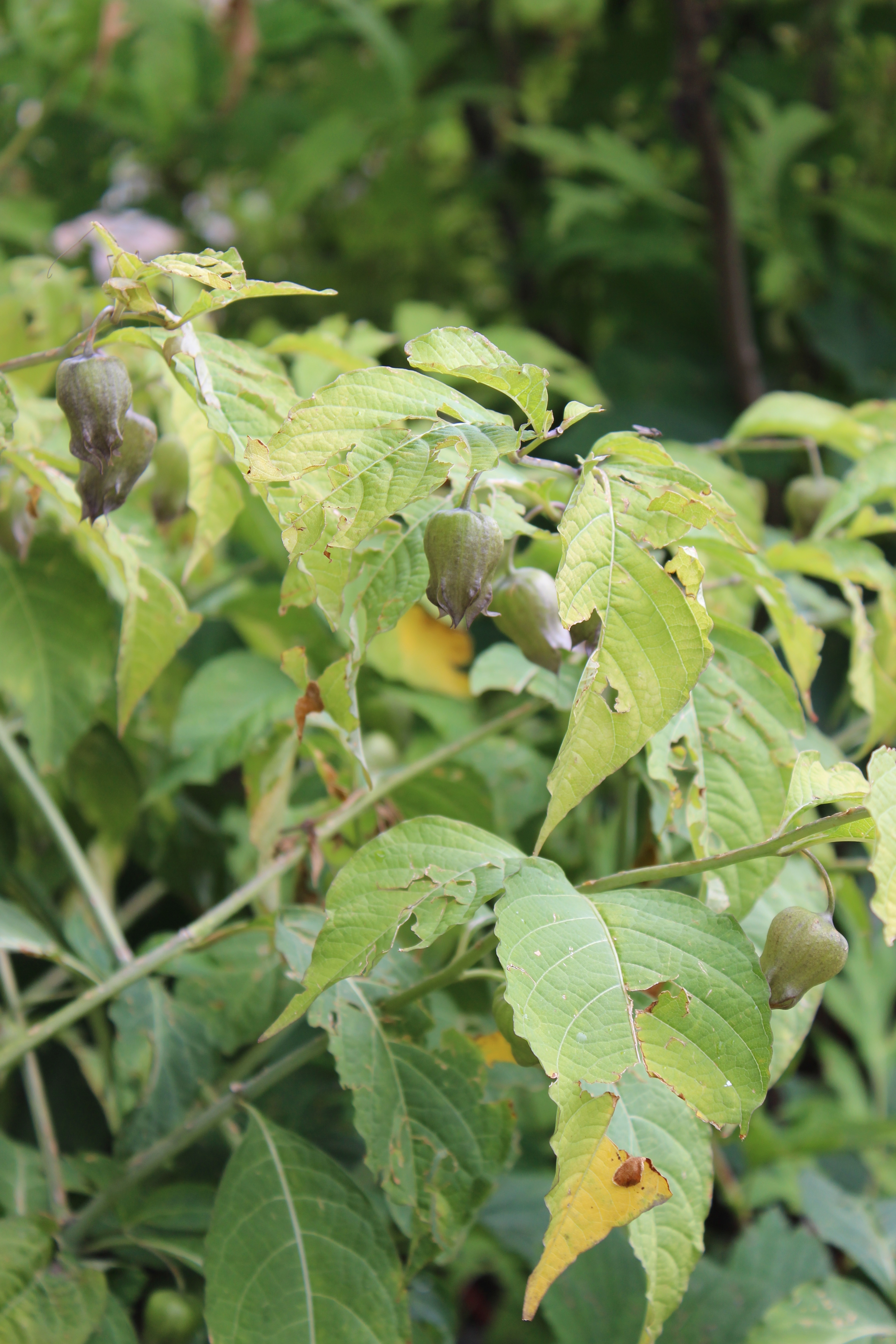
- Atropanthe sinensis (in fruit)

Scientific classification
- Kingdom: Plantae
- Clade: Tracheophytes
- Clade: Angiosperms
- Clade: Eudicots
- Clade: Asterids
- Order: Solanales
- Family: Solanaceae
- Subfamily: Solanoideae
- Tribe: Hyoscyameae
- Genus: Atropanthe; Pascher

= Atropanthe =

Genus of flowering plants

Atropanthe (Chinese name 天蓬子 tian peng zi) is a monotypic genus of flowering plants belonging to tribe Hyoscyameae of subfamily Solanoideae of the family Solanaceae.

The single species, Atropanthe sinensis (Hemsl.) Pascher is native to the temperate forests of S. Central China (to Hunan). It is a herbaceous perennial (specifically a rhizomatous hemicryptophyte) which bears a marked similarity (particularly in regard to the form of the corolla) to the related genus Atropa - whence the genus name Atropanthe ( meaning ‘having a flower resembling that of Atropa’). Unlike Atropa, however (and in common with the other genera belonging to subtribe Hyoscyaminae of Hyoscyameae) Atropanthe bears a dry, pyxidial fruit, resembling a pot with a lid (Atropa, the sole member of subtribe Atropinae, bears, by contrast, a fruit taking the form of a juicy, glistening berry).

== Description ==
A glabrous (apart from the pubescent inflorescence) subshrub or perennial herb arising from thick rhizomes to a height of 0.8-1.5 m and bearing erect, terete or angled stems of a dark blue-purple colour, each bearing two or three green branches. Leaves mostly paired, petiolate, entire, petioles 1-4.5 cm; leaf blades elliptic to ovate, 11-22 × 4–12 cm, papery, glabrous, bases cuneate, slightly decurrent, tips pointed. Flowers greenish-yellow, borne singly in the leaf axils. Corolla circa 3.2 cm, 5-lobed, somewhat zygomorphic, tubular-campanulate, twice as long as calyx, 15-veined; lobes subequal, corolla aestivation quincuncial. Stamens inserted in corolla tube, unequal, shorter than or equaling corolla; filaments circa 2 cm, unequal, circinnate in the bud and curved at flowering, inserted near the base of the corolla, pubescent at base; anthers somewhat heart-shaped, ventrifixed, 4-4.5mm dehiscing longitudinally. Disc orange, ringlike, slightly lobed. Pedicel at time of flowering elongate, glabrous 1-2.5 cm. Calyx at flowering tubular-campanulate or somewhat urceolate, slightly inflated, somewhat bent, 15-veined, with 5 main veins, papery, glabrous, circa 2 cm; lobes subequal, deltate to rounded erose to ciliate, glabrescent. Pedicel at time of fruiting barely thickened, 3-3.5 cm. Fruiting calyx hanging downward, the broad inflated base uppermost and the constricted but open mouth held below, conical, ovoid, or oblong, usually lantern-like/top-shaped, 2.5–3 cm in diameter, inserted abruptly on pedicel and easily detached from it after drying. Fruit a pyxidium (i.e. a capsule resembling a pot with a lid), the downward-pointing operculum (= "lid") dehiscing to liberate seeds which fall, on ripening, through the downward-pointing opening of the bladder-like fruiting calyx. Pyxidium turbinate (shaped like a spinning top) 1.8–2 cm in diameter, containing some 40-50 seeds. Seeds brown, rectangular, somewhat compressed, circa 3 × 2.5 mm, the testa thick, bearing a wavy-netted pattern (foveolate).

== Range ==
An area encompassing NW Guizhou, W Hubei, SE Sichuan and NE Yunnan and including the Hengduan Mountains.

== Habitat ==
Humid places (moist soils), along ditches, forests; at altitudes of 1400–3000 m.

== Medicinal use ==
Like all the other genera of the Solanaceous tribe Hyoscyameae (of which the best-known member is the infamous deadly nightshade), the genus Atropanthe is rich in tropane alkaloids - compounds possessing anticholinergic properties which are therapeutically useful in small doses and dangerously hallucinogenic (deliriant) in larger ones. The roots of the single species A. sinensis are used in Traditional Chinese medicine for the relief of muscular spasm and pain.

== Chemistry ==
Atropanthe sinensis contains the tropane alkaloids hyoscyamine and anisodine and also the pyrrolidine alkaloid bellaradine, a.k.a. cuscohygrine, (which is not one of the tropane alkaloids, but may be biogenetically related to them) and occurs also in the closely related genera Atropa, Anisodus and Przewalskia.

== Translation of Chinese common name ==
The Chinese vernacular name for A. sinensis, 天蓬子 has been transliterated into Latin script both as tiān péng zi and tien pung tzu. An approximate pronunciation (not allowing fully for the tonal aspect of Chinese) is "tien pong dzuu". The name is composed of the individual characters 天 tiān "heaven"/"sky"/"day” 蓬 péng "disheveled/flourishing/vigorous/forming clumps" and 子 zi variously "son", "seed" and a nominalising suffix (indicating the conversion into a noun of another part of speech). The two-character compound 天蓬 (tiān péng - minus the 子 zi) translates into English as "canopy. 天蓬子 (tiān péng zi) in its entirety could thus, prosaically, indicate a vigorous and untidy, clump-forming plant, forming a canopy of foliage in which its seeds hang or are borne, unless 天 (tiān) were translated in the more metaphysical sense of "heaven"/"heavenly", intended to suggest that the effects of consuming the plant could be perceived as somehow otherworldly - a suggestion compatible with the well-documented use in ancient Chinese Taoist practices of other Solanaceous plants as entheogens enabling the taker to "see spirits".

=== Botanical translations of 蓬 (péng) ===
A further complication in the translation of the plant name for Atropanthe 天蓬子 (tiān péng zi) is that the character 蓬 (péng) has a number of botanical translations in its own right, yielding the meanings "type of raspberry", Korean mugwort and fleabane. The raspberry plant (Rubus sp.) and Artemisia princeps (Asteraceae), the Korean mugwort have in common the characteristic of being very vigorous plants and the mugwort is considered not only an edible plant but also a magical one, holding a prominent place in the story of the bear-woman, Ungnyeo - the foundational myth of the Korean nation. It may be that Atropanthe sinensis was perceived in China to share certain characteristics of these plants - possibly simply their vigour or rapidity of growth/potential invasiveness.

== A. mairei synonym for plant in different family ==
A potential source of confusion in regard to the monotypic status of this Solanaceous genus is the existence of the binomial Atropanthe mairei (H.Lév.) H.Lév., which is listed by Kew as a synonym of Cyananthus flavus subsp. montanus (C.Y.Wu) D.Y.Hong & L.M.Ma. (the genus Cyananthus belongs, not to the Solanaceae, but to the bellflower family Campanulaceae). Atropanthe mairei (H. Léveillé) H. Léveillé was identified by Lauener in 1978 as being Cyananthus albiflorus D.F. Chamberlain, which is now correctly known as C. flavus subsp. montanus (C.Y.Wu) D.Y.Hong & L.M.Ma.

== Gallery ==
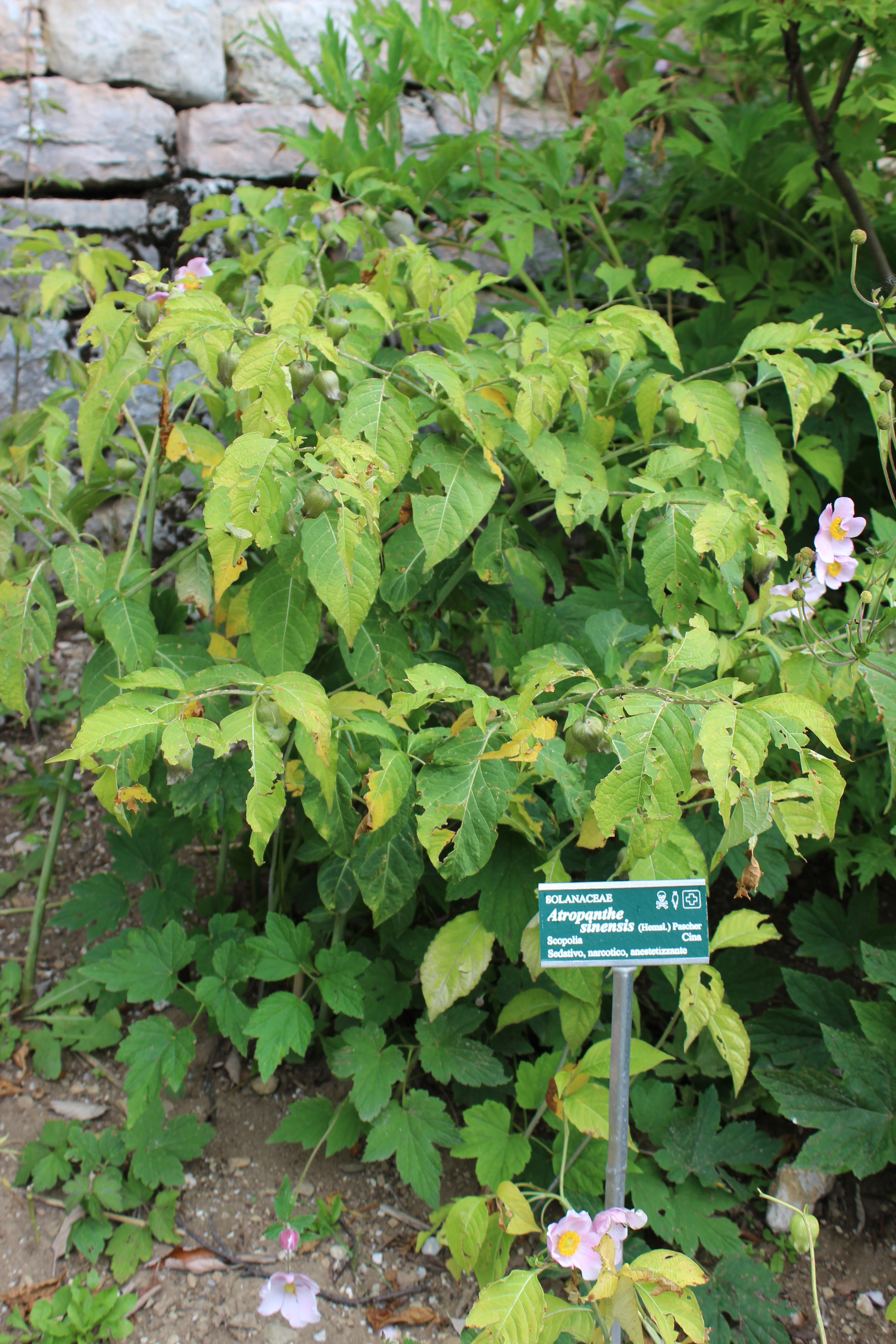
A.sinensis (planted beside pink-flowered Anemone japonica and Paeonia ludlowii) in Viote Alpine Botanical Garden, South Tyrol. Italian language label lists ‘sedative, narcotic, anaesthetic’
