= Atropa pallidiflora =

Hyrcanian belladonna

Scientific classification
- Kingdom: Plantae
- Clade: Tracheophytes
- Clade: Angiosperms
- Clade: Eudicots
- Clade: Asterids
- Order: Solanales
- Family: Solanaceae
- Genus: Atropa
- Species: A. pallidiflora

Binomial name
- Atropa pallidiflora Schönb.-Tem.

Species of plant

Atropa pallidiflora is a close relative of the infamous deadly nightshade and, like it, is an extremely poisonous plant, containing a variety of tropane alkaloids valued in medicine for their anticholinergic, antispasmodic and mydriatic properties and deliriant in excess. Atropa pallidiflora is the least well-known of the four currently accepted species of Atropa and is endemic to the remarkable Caspian Hyrcanian mixed forests of Northern Iran, which can boast all the species of Atropa currently recognised, with the sole exception of the strictly Ibero-Maghrebi Atropa baetica. The binomial Atropa pallidiflora was published by Eva Schönbeck-Temesy in volume 100 ('Solanaceae') of Karl Heinz Rechinger's monumental Flora Iranica in 1972. The specific name pallidiflora signifies 'bearing flowers of a pale, wan or washed-out hue' and, while appropriate, is not especially evocative, given that the flowers of most Atropa species are far from vivid (only the flowers of the yellow-flowered form (as opposed to the green) of Atropa baetica could be said to have a colour that is cheerful rather than sombre). The flowers of A. pallidiflora, like those of A.baetica, vary from greenish to yellow, but, as the designation 'having pallid flowers' might suggest, the yellow in question is a dingy greenish-yellow that is far from ornamental. The geographical term 'Hyrcanian' in the common name signifies that the plant is native to what was once the satrapy of Hyrcania, the name of which derives (via Ancient Greek) from an Iranian root meaning 'wolf' : Hyrcania is thus the 'Land of Wolves' ( - see also Gorgan). The name is an apt one, since the Hyrcanian forests have long been known as a hunting ground (or, in modern parlance, 'ecosystem') of legendary richness and beauty : the lush forests could support an abundance of large, mammalian herbivores, which in turn could support an abundance of apex predators - notably the wolf, but also the Persian leopard and even the tiger. The word 'Hyrcanian' (also its variant form 'Hyrcan') will be familiar to any diligent reader of the works of William Shakespeare, as an epithet of the proverbially savage (but now, sadly, extinct) Caspian Tiger, known to the dramatist from his reading of the works of various Latin authors - who, in turn, were familiar with the Ancient Greek coinage 'Hyrcania' and the lands adjoining the Caspian Sea to which the place name referred. Regarding the richness of the Hyrcanian flora - of which Atropa pallidiflora is a noteworthy element - it is worth mentioning that the name of the modern Iranian province of Golestan (which constitutes the easternmost portion of ancient Hyrcania) has the delightful meanings of 'Rose Garden' and 'Land of Flowers'.

== Description ==
Unusually for an Atropa species, A. pallidiflora is a shrub ('frutex' in the Latin description given in Flora Iranica - of which the following is a translation). Height 120–200 cm. Vegetative parts glabrous. Lower stems, in flowering part, more or less bent in zigzag fashion. Largest of lower leaves to 15.5 x 7.5 cm, ovate-lanceolate, widest at base, rarely oblong-lanceolate, rounded-cuneate or broadly cuneate at base, tip finely acuminate lengthwise, arched with lateral veins, blade decurrent into petiole by one fifth to one sixth of its length; lesser lower leaves half to a quarter the size of greater but of similar form, although often with a more rounded base and petioles growing progressively shorter up stem to point where uppermost leaves almost sessile. Upper leaves quickly diminished and narrowed, bases cuneate, the tips finely acuminate, the smaller ones greatly reduced, oblong-lanceolate becoming almost thread-like. Flowers sometimes solitary though often in pairs, the pedicels 1–2 cm (average 1.5 cm) in length, erect, puberulent-glandulose. Calyx circa 10–12 mm in length, set apart from tube of corolla, campanulate, puberulent-glandulose, divided approximately to the middle into triangular-acuminate lobes, the lobes being acuminate to hair-like and outspread-erect, in the fruiting stage 7–12 mm in length, ovate-triangular, outspread-stellate and reflexed. Corolla in the dry state 2-2.5 cm in length, more or less funnel-shaped to campanulate-urceolate with a greatly narrowed base, five-lobed (the lobes 6–7 mm in length), in texture marked irregularly with pits of ovate form, colour greenish to dirty greenish-yellow. Stamens of unequal length, somewhat exserted, bases of filaments woolly in region where united with lower part of corolla tube. Style longer than corolla. Berry 7–14 mm in diameter, globose-flattened, slightly umbonate and ribbed/lined, colour black-ish in the dry state (according to the testimony of Bornmüller, of a drab, yellow colour). Seeds 1.6–1.7 x 1.2–1.3 mm, angular-reniform, reticulate-foveolate (the partitions of the reticulations slightly wavy), of a brownish colour.

Note: it is apparent from the above that Professor Schönbeck-Temesy was writing her description using only dry, herbarium specimens (i.e. had not seen a living specimen of the plant), since the qualification 'in the dry state' (in sicco) appears in said description twice - once regarding the average length of the corolla and again in the description of the colour of the berry (which the drying process appears to have changed from yellow to blackish). See also translation below of the Prof.'s note in German re. specimens lacking underground parts.

== Comparisons with other Atropa species ==
Atropa pallidiflora differs from Atropa belladonna chiefly in its glabrescence (lack of hairs), also in its narrower leaves, its smaller yellow flowers with shorter pedicels and its smaller berries (always yellow, in the fresh state?)

- from Atropa komarovii in its most often ovate-lanceolate leaves and its flowers often produced in pairs and having puberulent-glandulose pedicels.

- and from Atropa acuminata in its leaves with very wide bases, its narrower (acuminate to hair-like) calyx lobes, the shorter pedicels of its flowers and the fact that, when in the early stages of fruiting, the calyces cover the berries to a lesser degree.

Atropa pallidiflora is closer in its morphology to A.acuminata than to any of the other species in the genus.

The description of A. pallidiflora as a shrub in Flora Iranica is curious, given that all the other Atropa species are herbaceous perennials of the type rhizomatous hemicryptophyte. Some light may be cast on this matter by a further note by Prof. Schönbeck-Temesy, which reads (in translation) 'The statement concerning the growth form (wuchsform) is based on a herbarium note, because the only voucher specimens available to me had been collected without underground parts'. The underground parts of a typical Atropa species would be rhizomes and their absence in the available specimens could conceivably have led (in part) to the designation of A.pallidiflora a woody rather than a herbaceous perennial. However, even allowing for the evidence of said herbarium note (made, presumably, by Dr. Žumer), the matter of the woodiness or otherwise of the species awaits clarification by the collection of more specimens and the photographing of the plant in its natural habitat. The resolution of this question is likely in the near future, thanks to the review of the genus Atropa which is currently in progress.

== Type ==
The type specimen of Atropa pallidiflora (of which there is a black and white photograph in the relevant volume of Flora Iranica) was collected by Slovenian botanist (and colleague of Professor Schönbeck-Temesy) Dr. Majda Žumer (see also Majda) on 28 September 1965 at a locality in the province of Mazandaran, near the port city of Nowshahr, with an altitude of 40m above sea level. Note: Dr. Žumer's surname is rendered, throughout Flora Iranica, as 'Zhumer' (i.e. in the Latin alphabet, without the use of the Slovenian diacritic (overring) on the 'Z').

== Distribution ==
Atropa pallidiflora is confined to the central part of a narrow belt of temperate rainforest fringing the Southern shore of the Caspian Sea, stretching (travelling from West to East) from the Talysh Mountains of the extreme Southeast of Azerbaijan through the Iranian provinces of Gilan, Mazandaran and Golestan and petering out in two spurs of woodland in Iran's North Khorasan province. The Northern spur ends near the village of Ghosha Tapeh and the Southern near the village of Havar and neither is far from the Kopet Dag range marking the border between Iran and Turkmenistan - where another Atropa species Atropa komarovii Blin.and Shalyt. (also an accepted species) is to be found. Viewed on Google Earth, this richly-forested region (the Shomal) stands out in deep green, contrasting sharply with the arid tones of the bulk of the Iranian plateau to the South, and it comes as no surprise to learn that it constitutes essentially a 'hotter spot' within the Irano-Anatolian biodiversity hotspot, namely the Northern edge of the Elburz Range forest steppe ecoregion - which is to say the North slope of the Alborz mountains - benefitting from the moisture from the Caspian Sea. Atropa pallidiflora is found mainly (possibly even exclusively) in that portion of the Hyrcanian forest belt lying within the province of Mazandaran (see also Tabaristan), although it may occur also in the adjoining parts of eastern Gilan and western Golestan. Flora Iranica lists the following localities in Mazandaran : a) Karehsang (referable probably to the Karehsang Hydrological station in the valley of the Haraz River), b) Abanjarmahali, c) the type locality near Nowshahr, d) a locality between Abbasabad and Shahi, e) a locality to the south of Amol and lastly f) a locality to the south of Chalus. Although the number of localities listed for A. pallidiflora is small, a comparison of the respective altitudes of these with the altitudes of localities listed in Flora Iranica for other Atropa species leads to the tentative conclusion that it is the species with the most lowland distribution and thus, potentially, the species most vulnerable to habitat damage caused by a proliferation of urban sprawl in those areas of Mazandaran fringing the Caspian.
