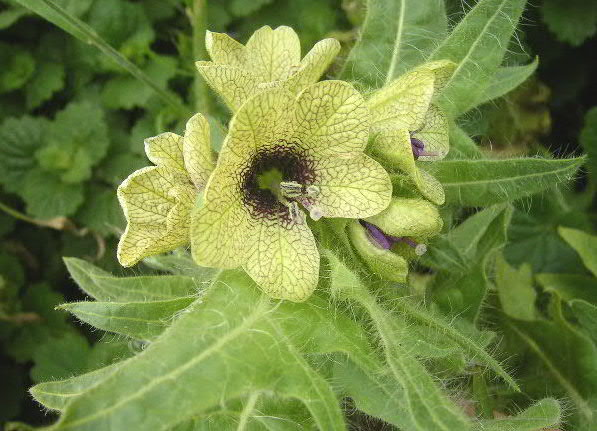
- Hyoscyamus niger

Scientific classification
- Kingdom: Plantae
- Clade: Tracheophytes
- Clade: Angiosperms
- Clade: Eudicots
- Clade: Asterids
- Order: Solanales
- Family: Solanaceae
- Subfamily: Solanoideae
- Tribe: Hyoscyameae

Genera
- Anisodus; Atropa; Atropanthe; Hyoscyamus; Pauia (unresolved); Physochlaina; Przewalskia; Scopolia

= Hyoscyameae =

Tribe of flowering plants

Hyoscyameae is an Old World tribe of the subfamily Solanoideae of the flowering plant family Solanaceae. It comprises seven genera: Anisodus, Atropa, Atropanthe, Hyoscyamus, Physochlaina, Przewalskia and Scopolia. The genera Atropanthe and Przewalskia are monotypic, the first being endemic to China and the second to Tibet.

All seven genera of the tribe are poisonous and have a long tradition of use as medicinal plants, being rich in tropane alkaloids with anticholinergic properties. Furthermore, the genera Atropa, Hyoscyamus, Scopolia and Physochlaina have furnished entheogens - the first three in the historical context of European witchcraft and, more specifically, of the flying ointments employed in such practices, while the similar chemistry of the remaining genera points to the potential for entheogenic use. Six of the genera have dry, pyxidial fruits i.e. capsules dehiscing by an operculum and thus resembling a pot with a lid. The fruit of the remaining genus Atropa is a glossy, juicy berry, making Atropa species especially dangerous poisonous plants, since - unlike other Hyoscyameae - their attractive fruits may easily be mistaken for edible berries, particularly by children - as has frequently occurred in the case of Atropa belladonna, the infamous Deadly Nightshade.

An eighth genus referable to Hyoscyameae remained unresolved until 2020: the poorly-known, monotypic genus Pauia contained the single species Pauia belladonna Deb and Dutta native to Assam and Arunachal Pradesh. The late Professor Armando Theodoro Hunziker, one of the foremost authorities on the Solanaceae, was of the opinion that Pauia should be subsumed in Atropa. The plant resembles the Indian Atropa acuminata, but differs from it most markedly in bearing a berry that, unlike those of other Atropa species, is not globose but oblong in shape, somewhat resembling that edible Solanaceous fruit the Goji. In 2020, the species was reclassified into genus Atropa as Atropa indobelladonna.

== Gallery ==
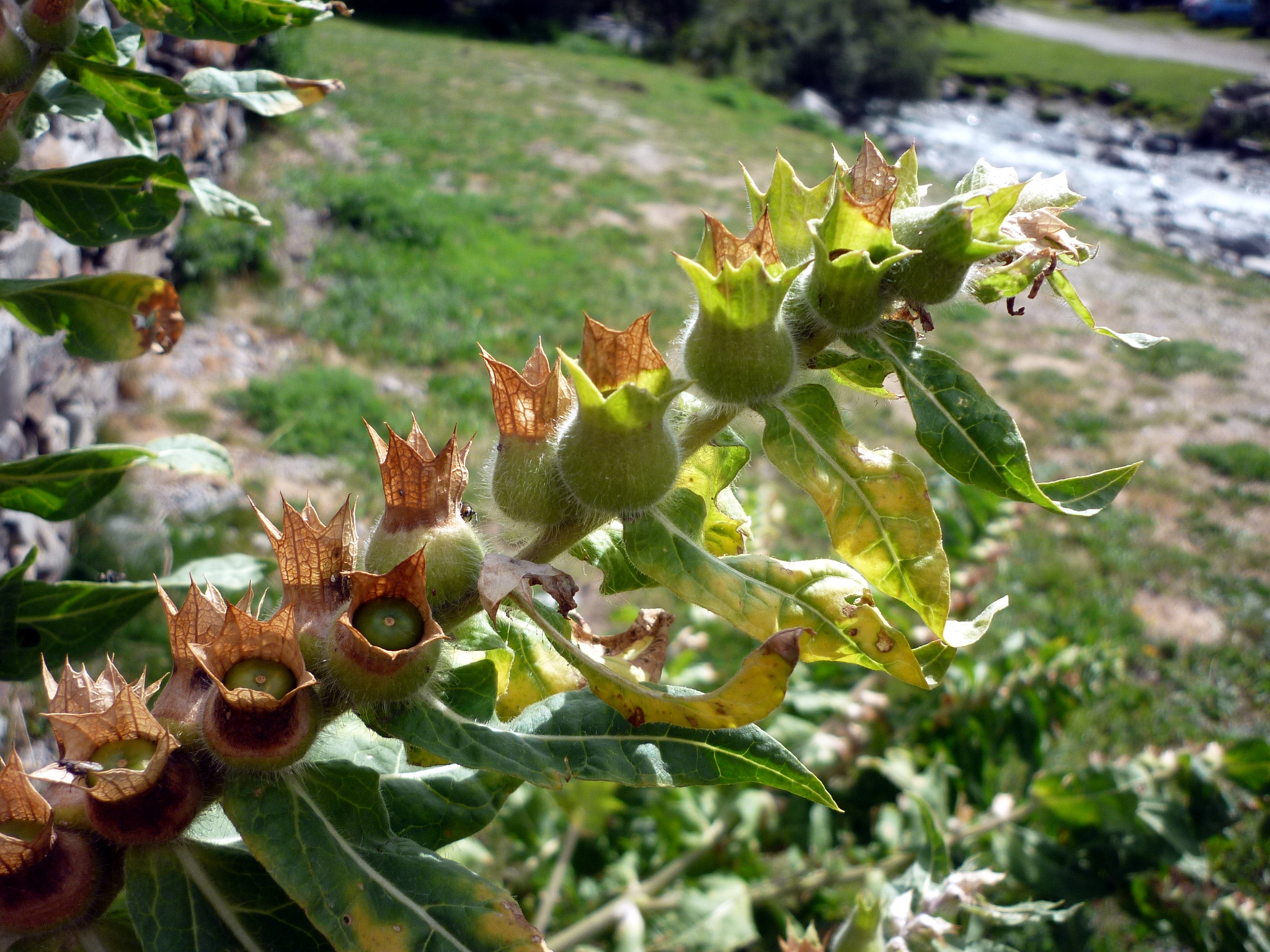
Pyxidial fruits of black henbane Hyoscyamus niger

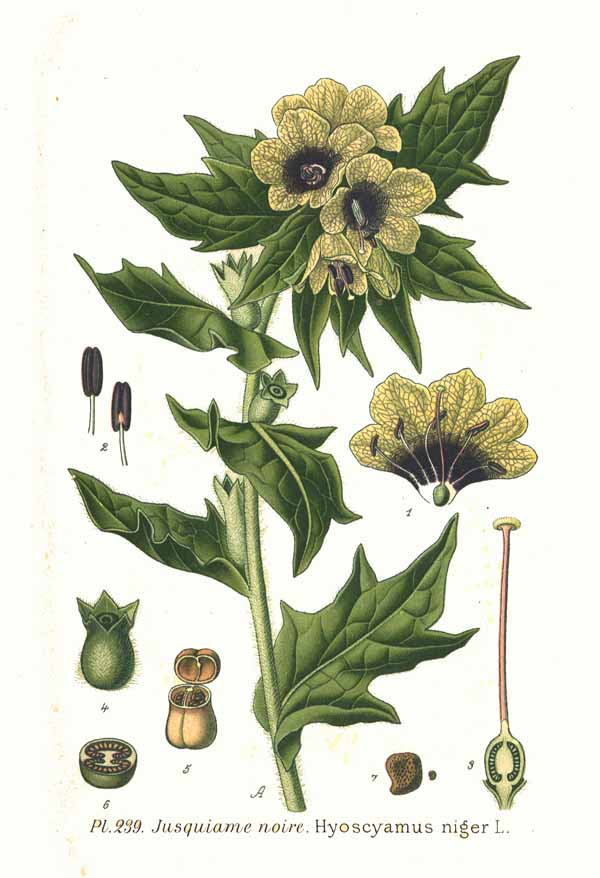
Anatomy of Hyoscyamus niger showing dissected pyxidium etc.

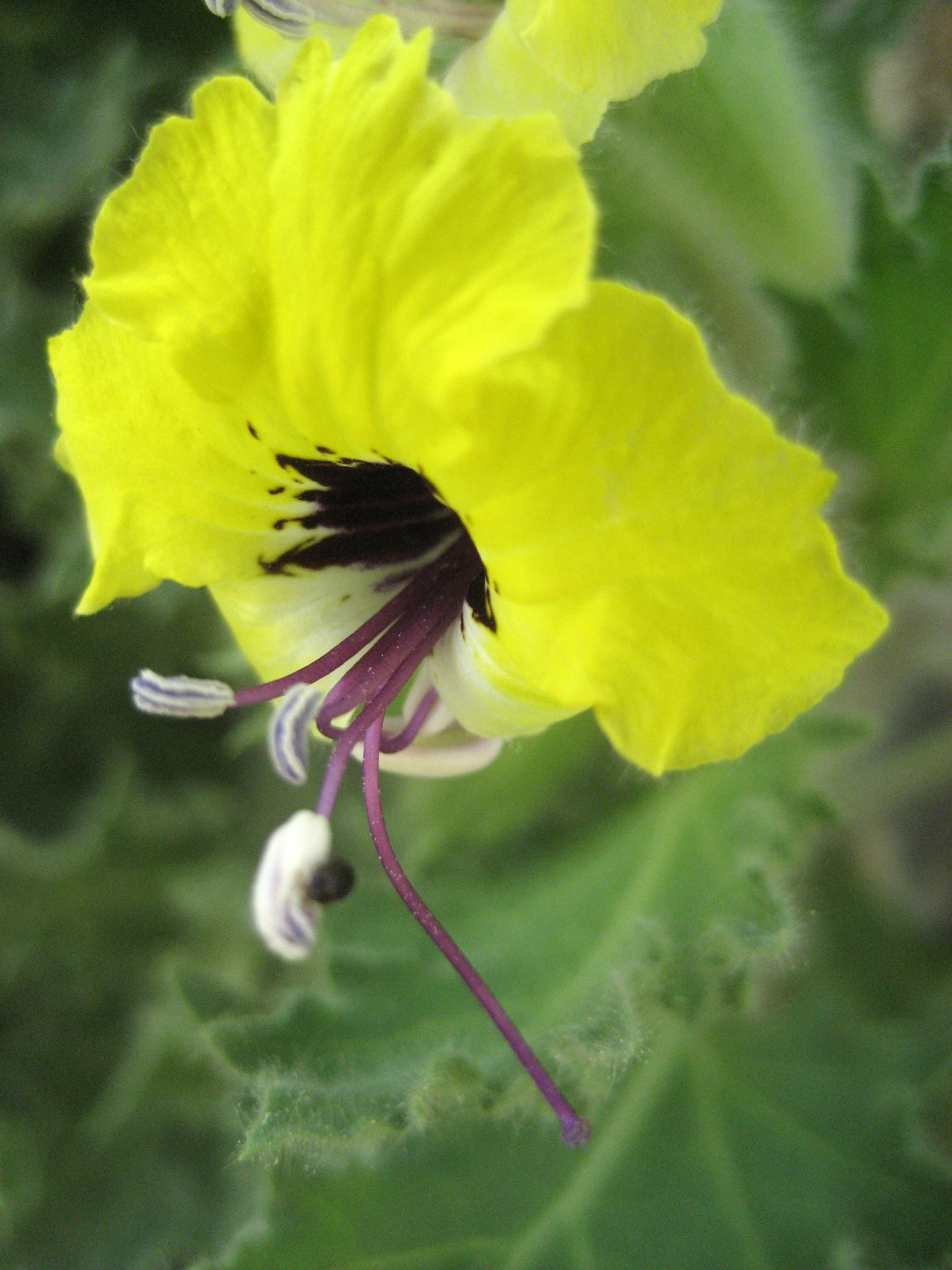
Golden henbane Hyoscyamus aureus single flower

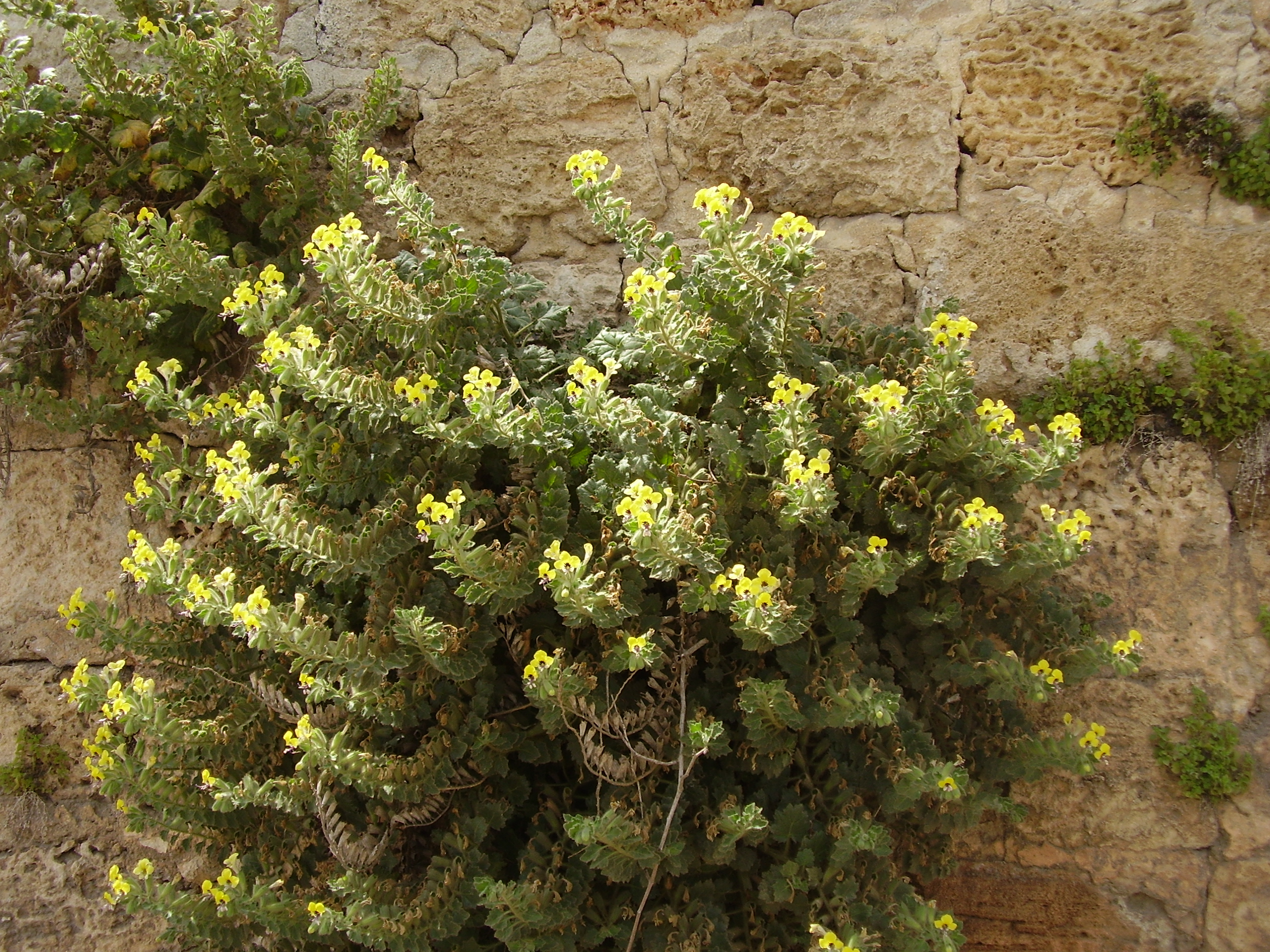
Hyoscyamus aureus in flower and fruit

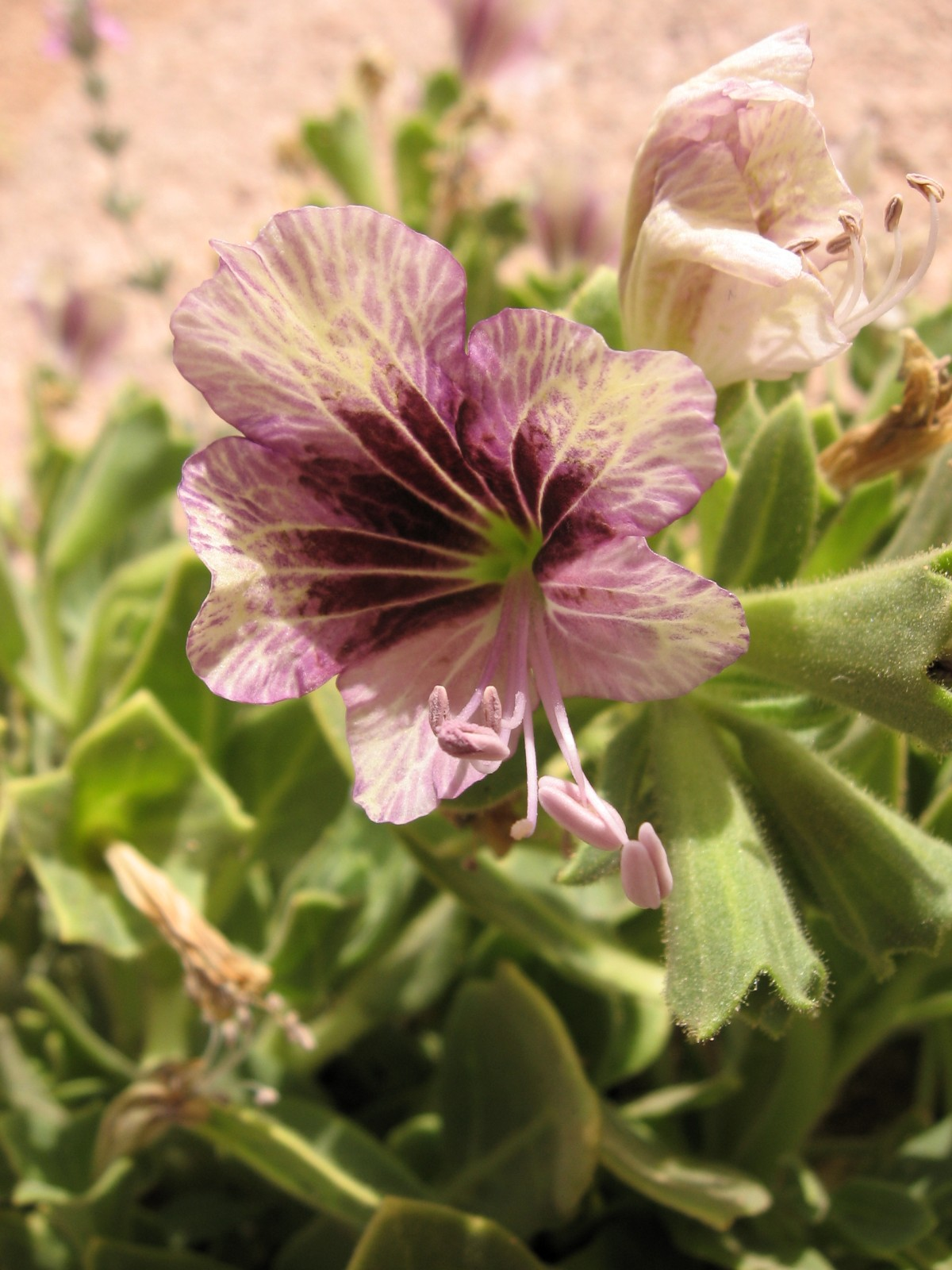
Egyptian Henbane Hyoscyamus muticus single flower interior

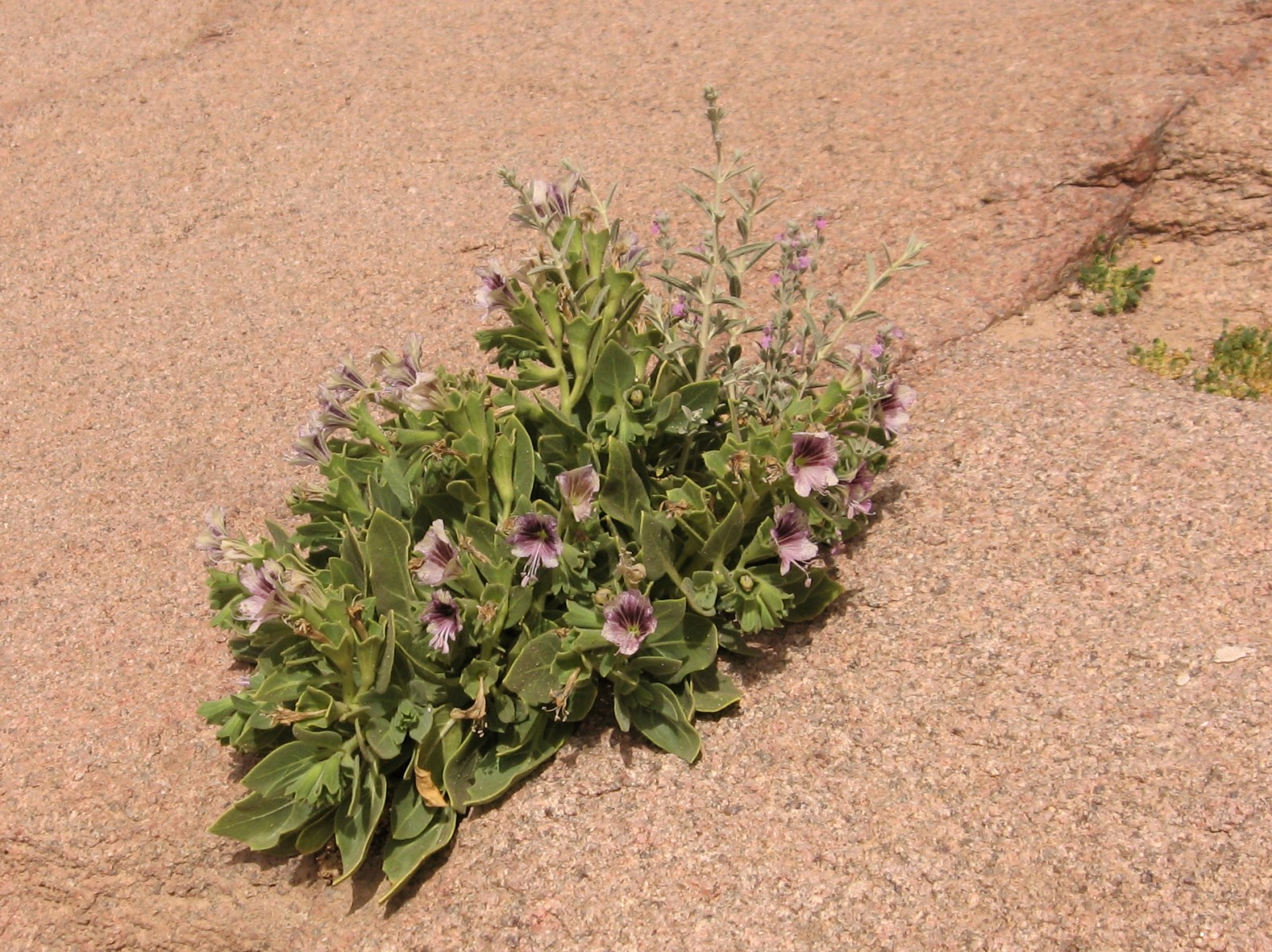
Hyoscyamus muticus plant in flower and fruit

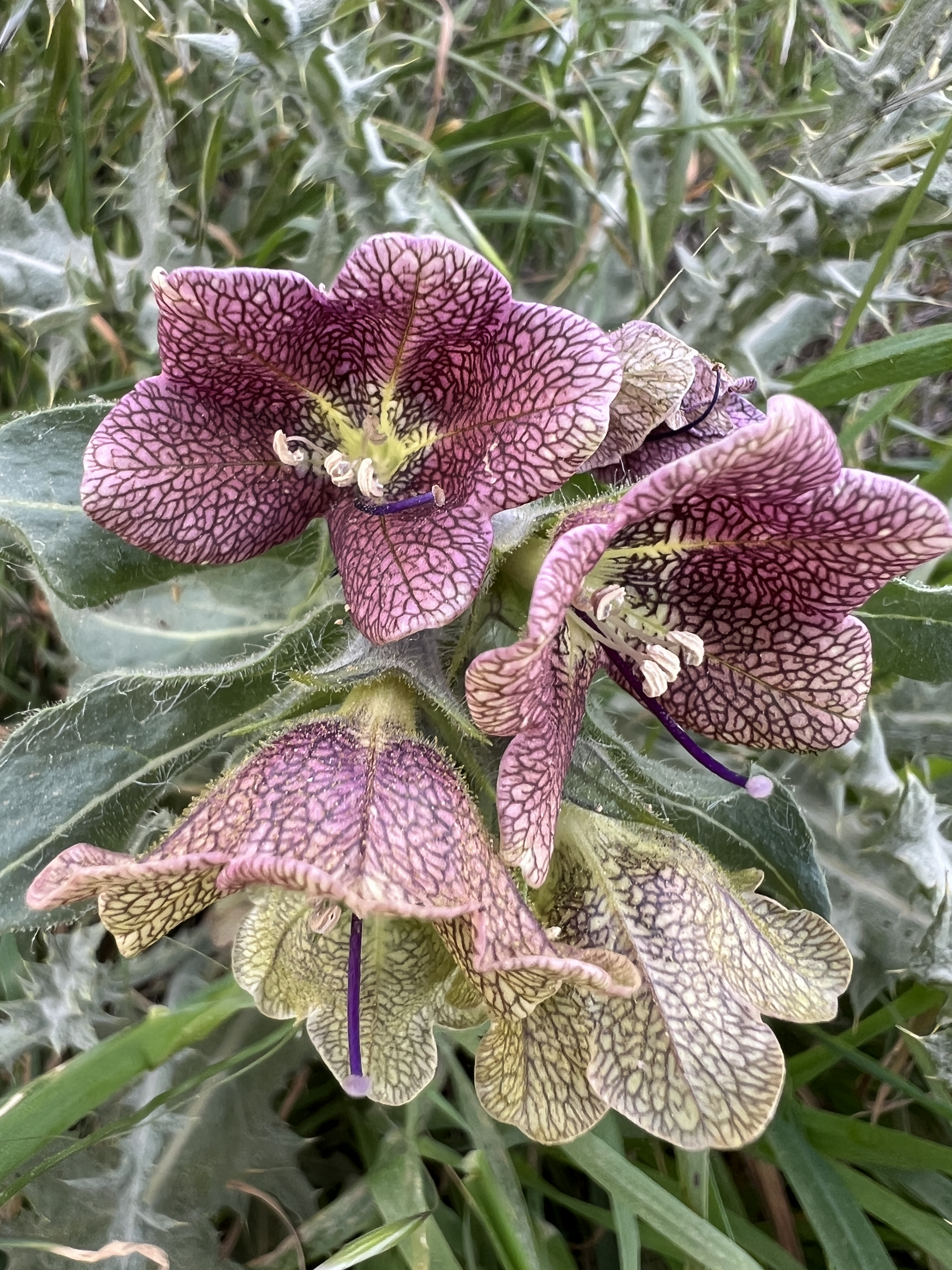
Hyoscyamus reticulatus flowers in close-up

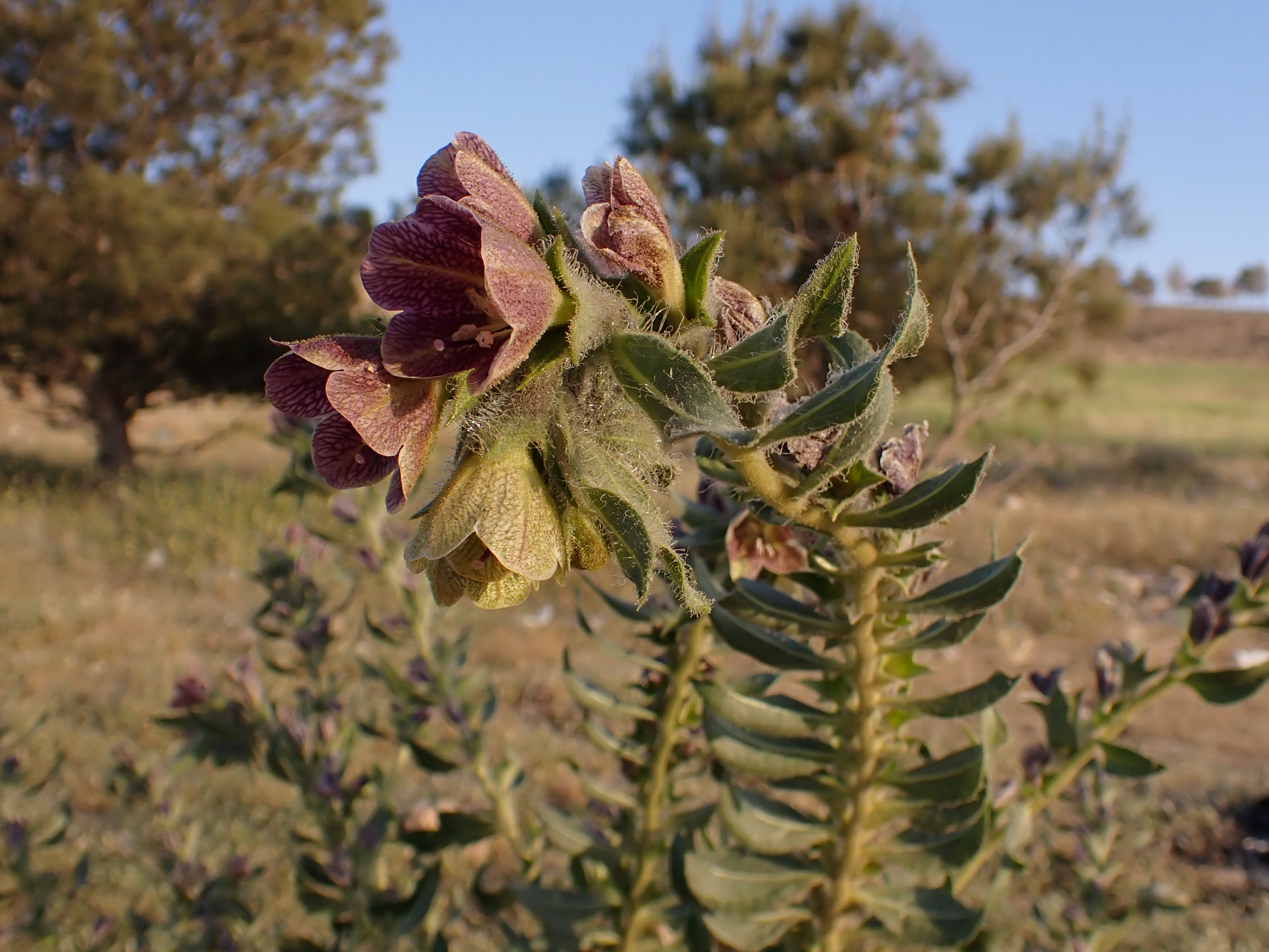
Hyoscyamus reticulatus flowering plant growth habit

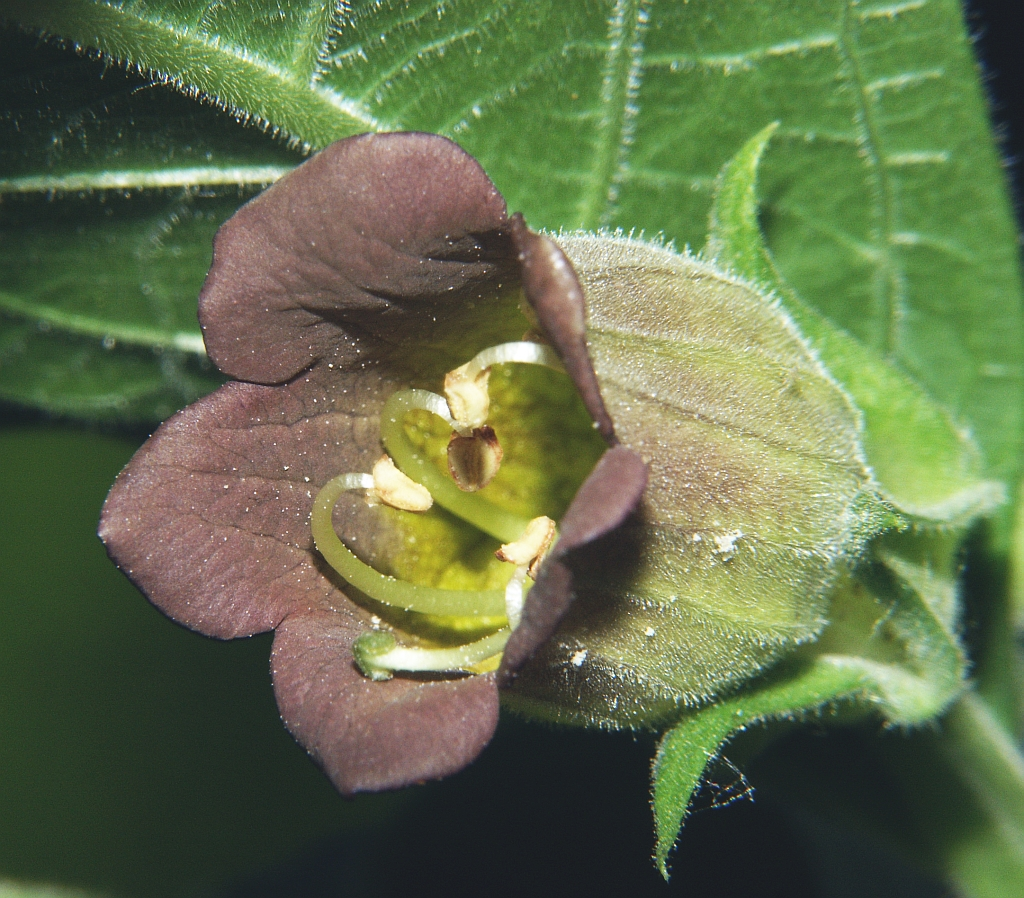
Flower of Atropa belladonna in close-up, showing curled stamens

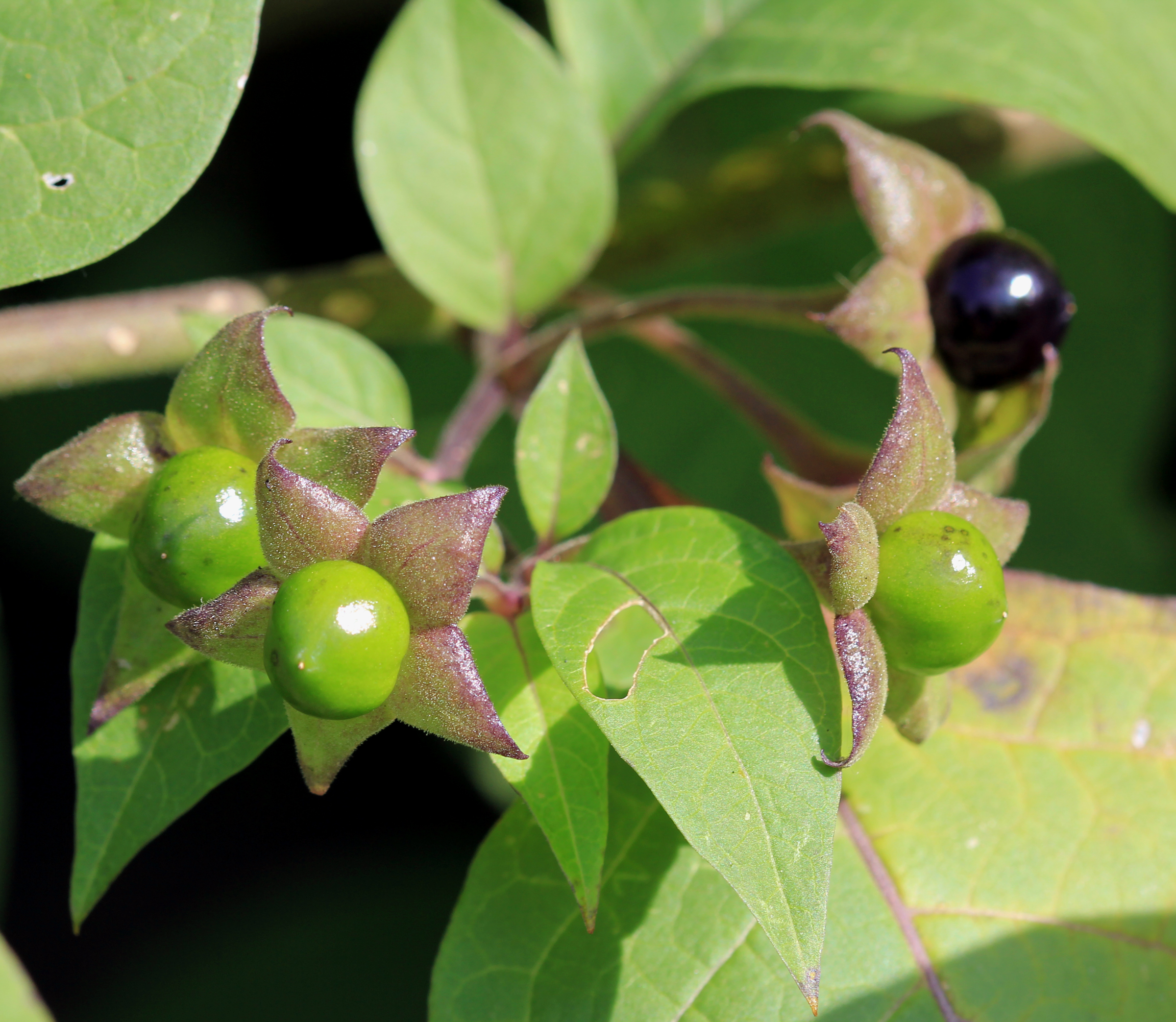
Atropa belladonna in fruit : ripe and unripe berries

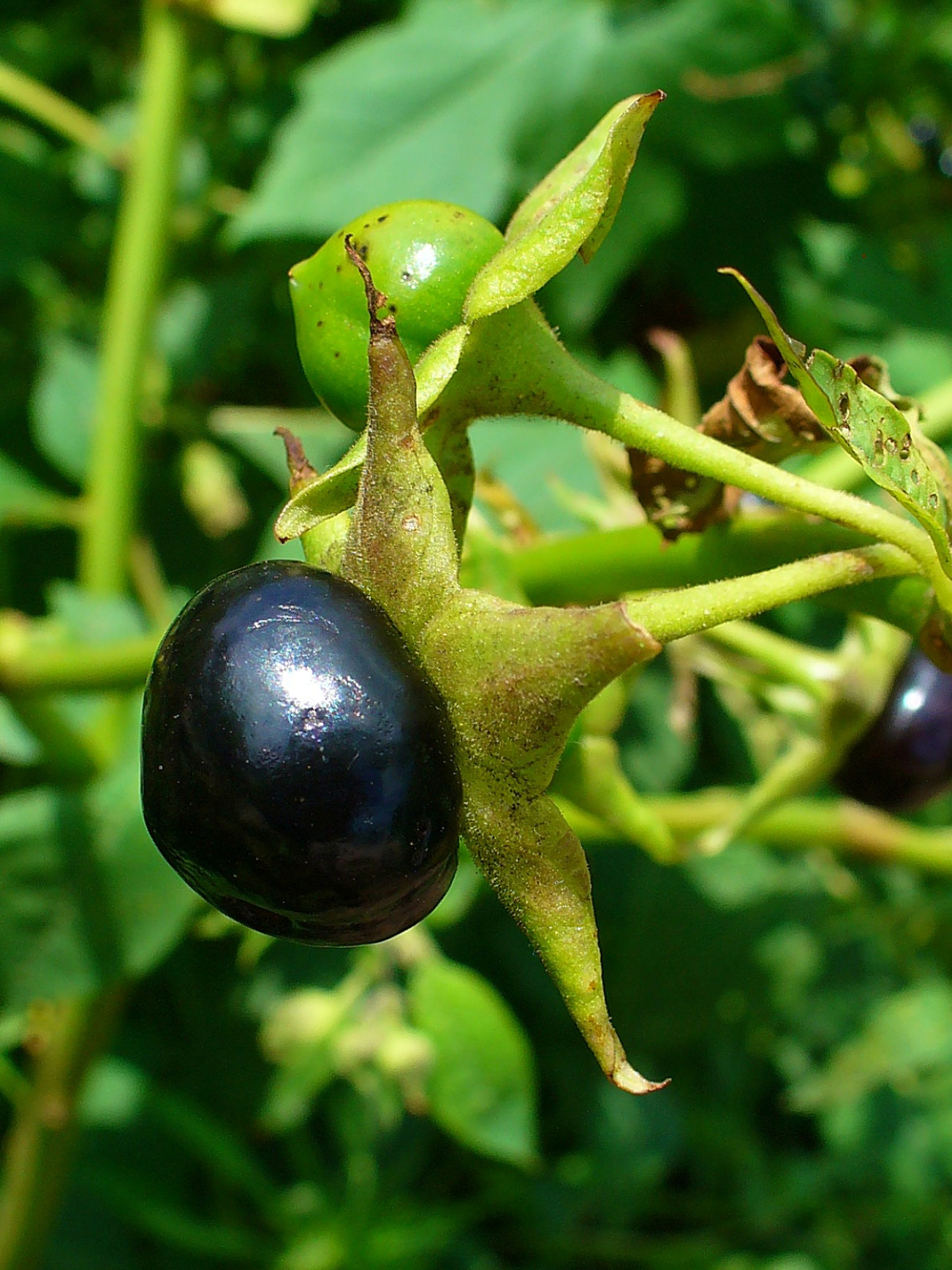
Atropa belladonna ripe berry in close-up

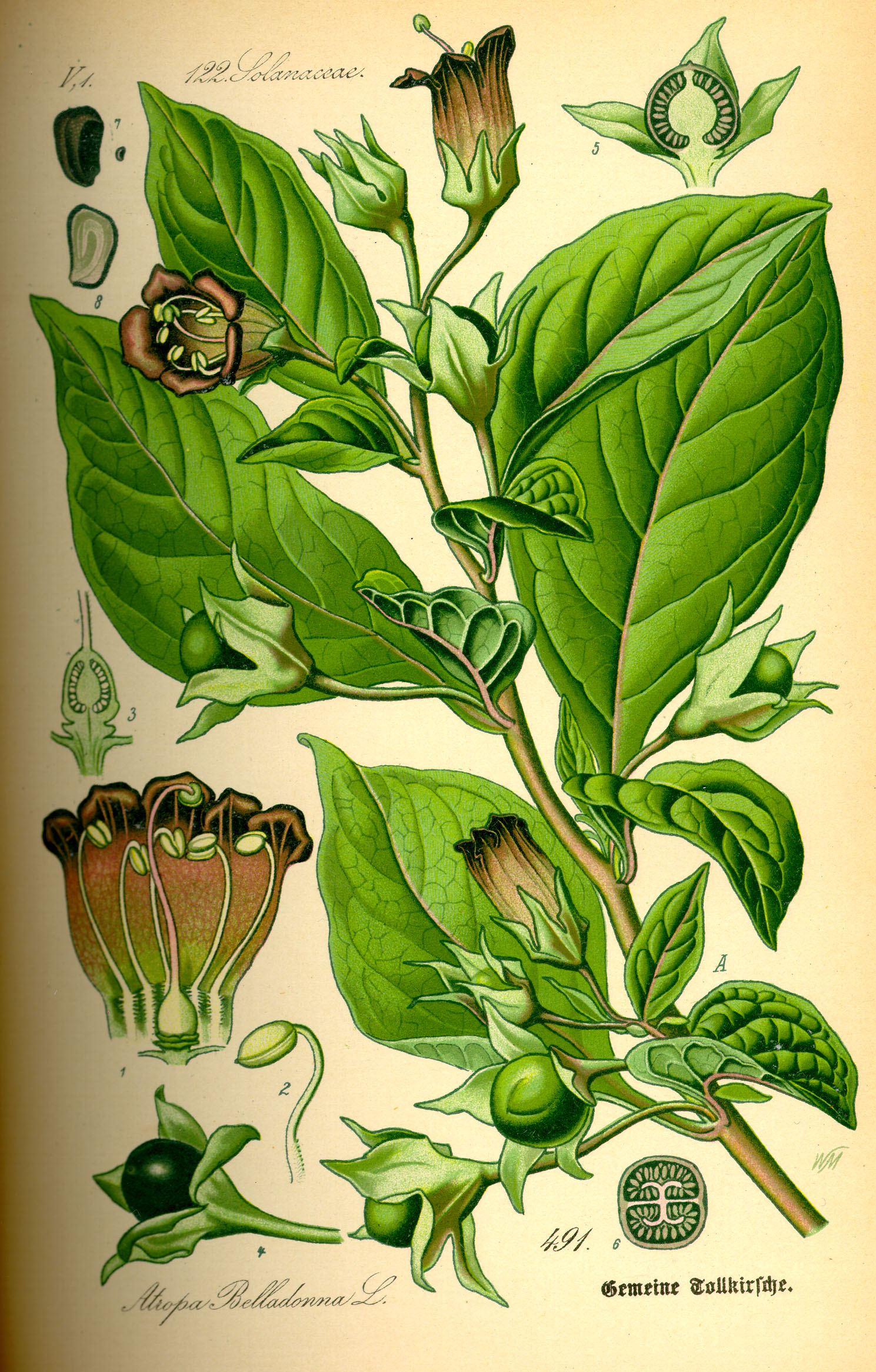
Anatomy of Atropa belladonna flower and berry

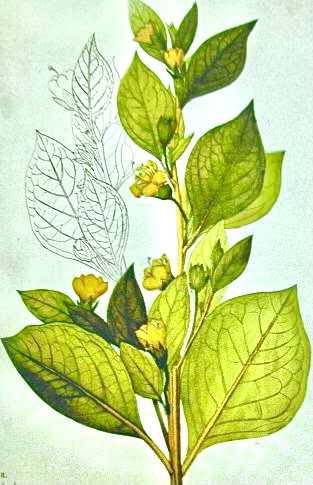
Botanical illustration of Atropa baetica, Andalusian belladonna

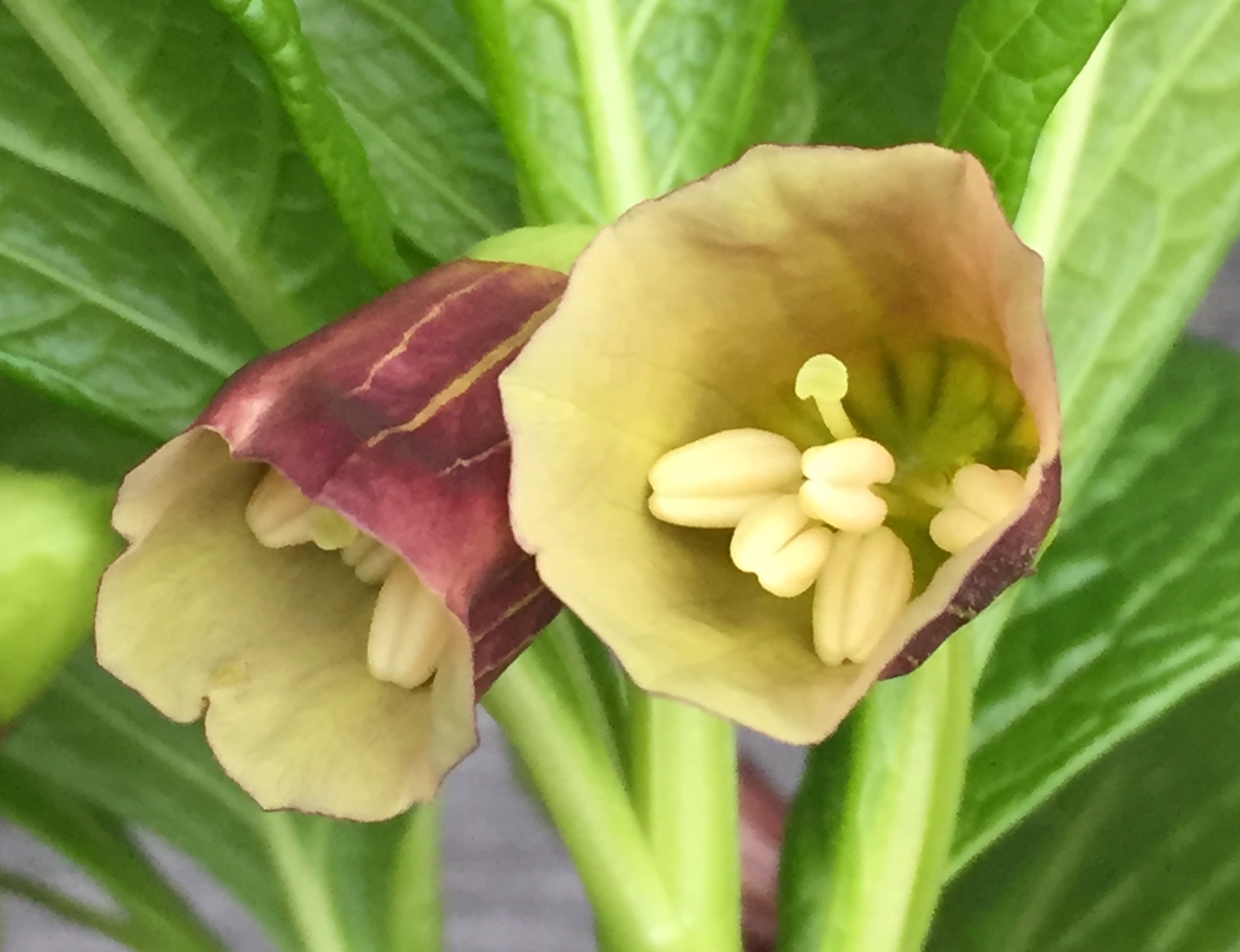
Scopolia carniolica: two flowers in close-up, showing unripe anthers - yet to dehisce.

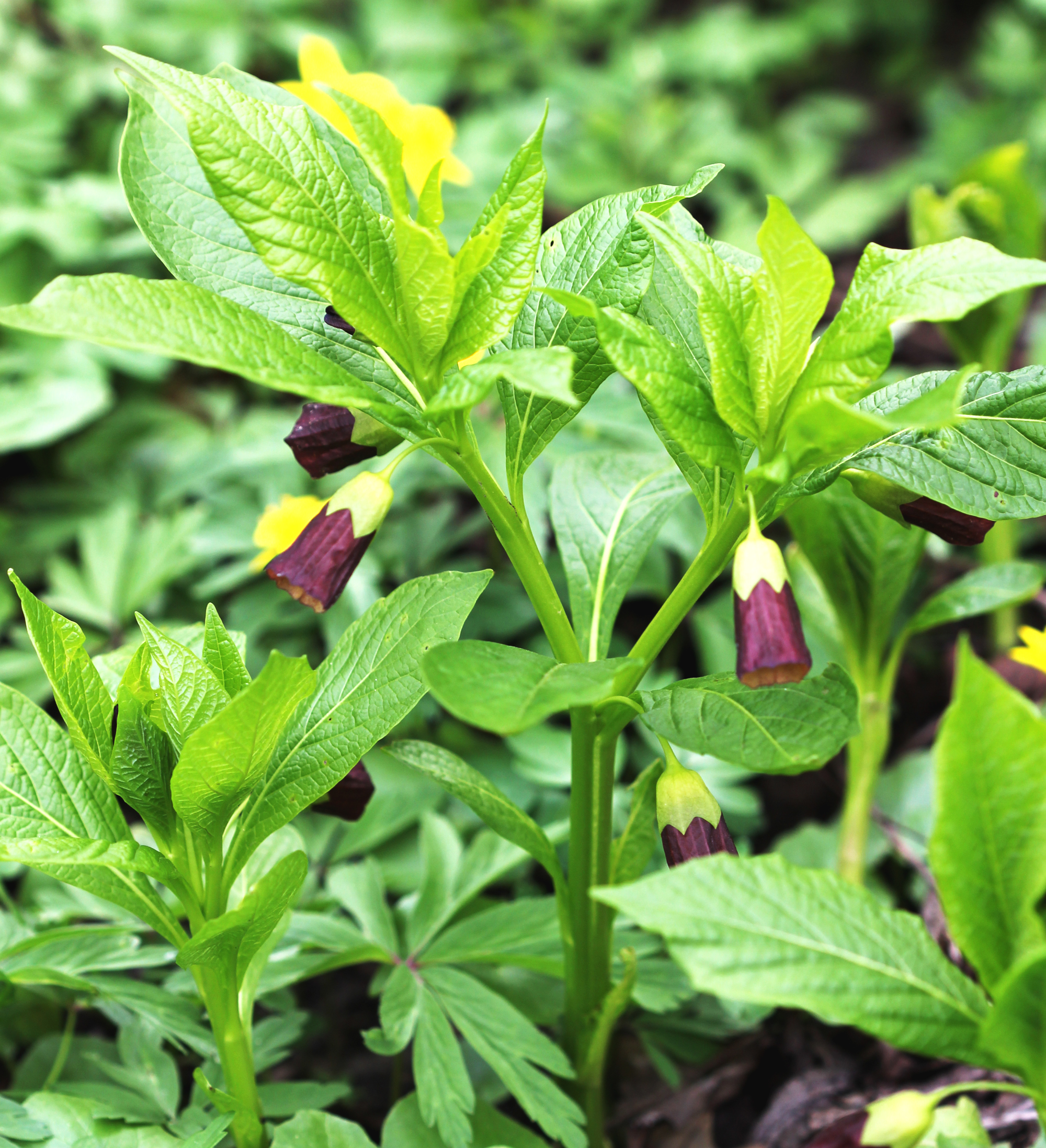
Scopolia carniolica in flower

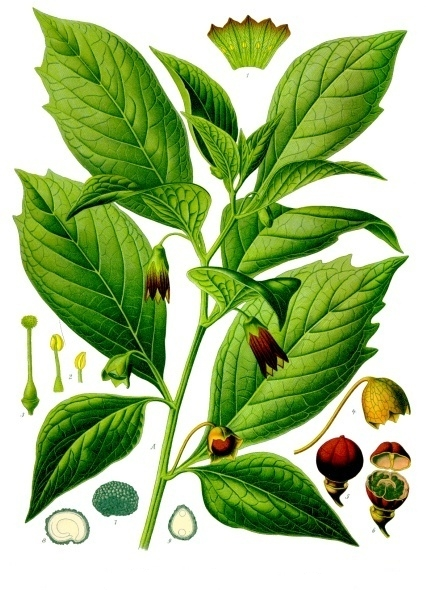
Anatomy of Scopolia carniolica, showing pyxidium etc.

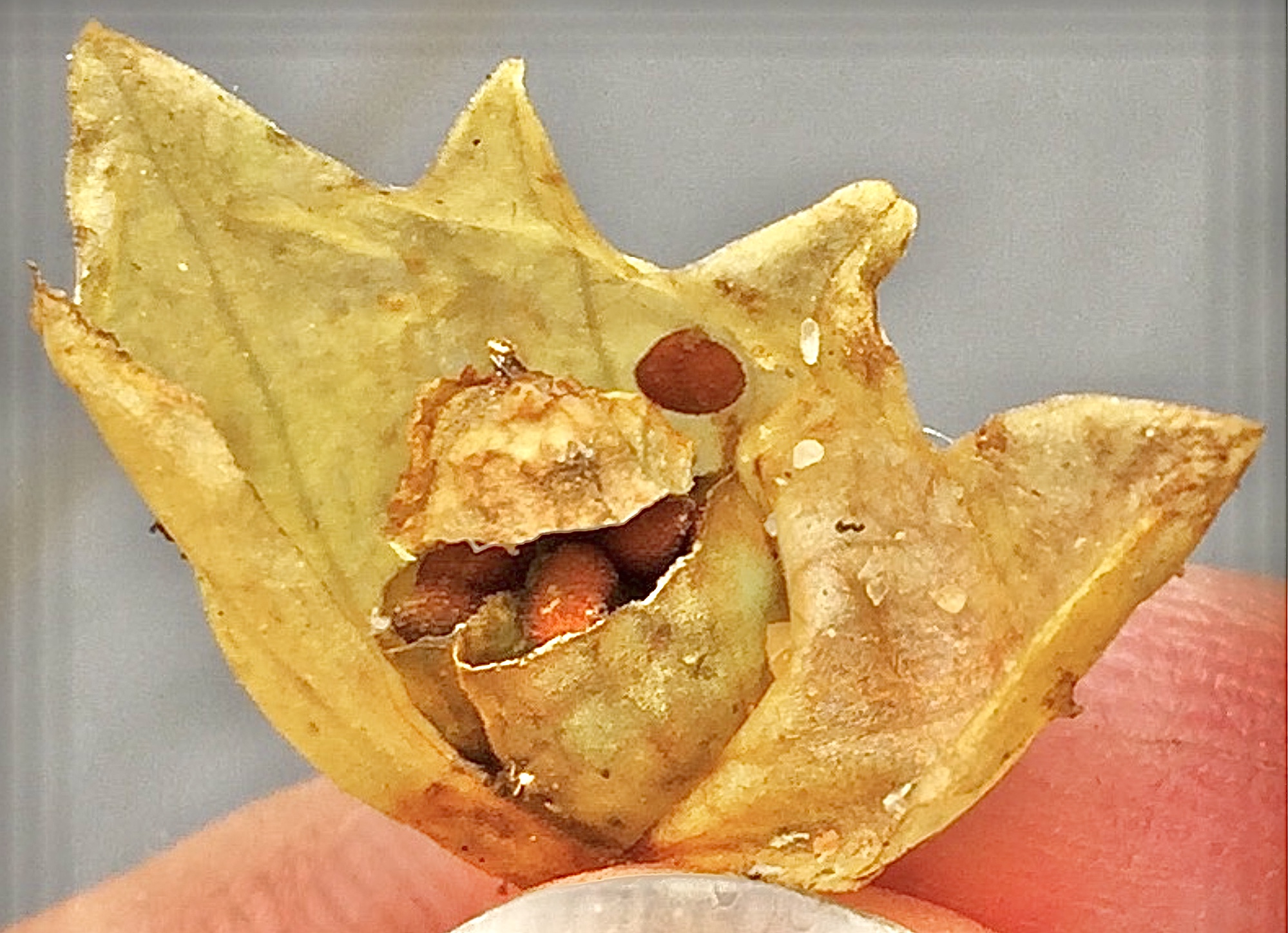
Scopolia carniolica: fruiting calyx dissected to reveal dehiscence of ripe pyxidium.

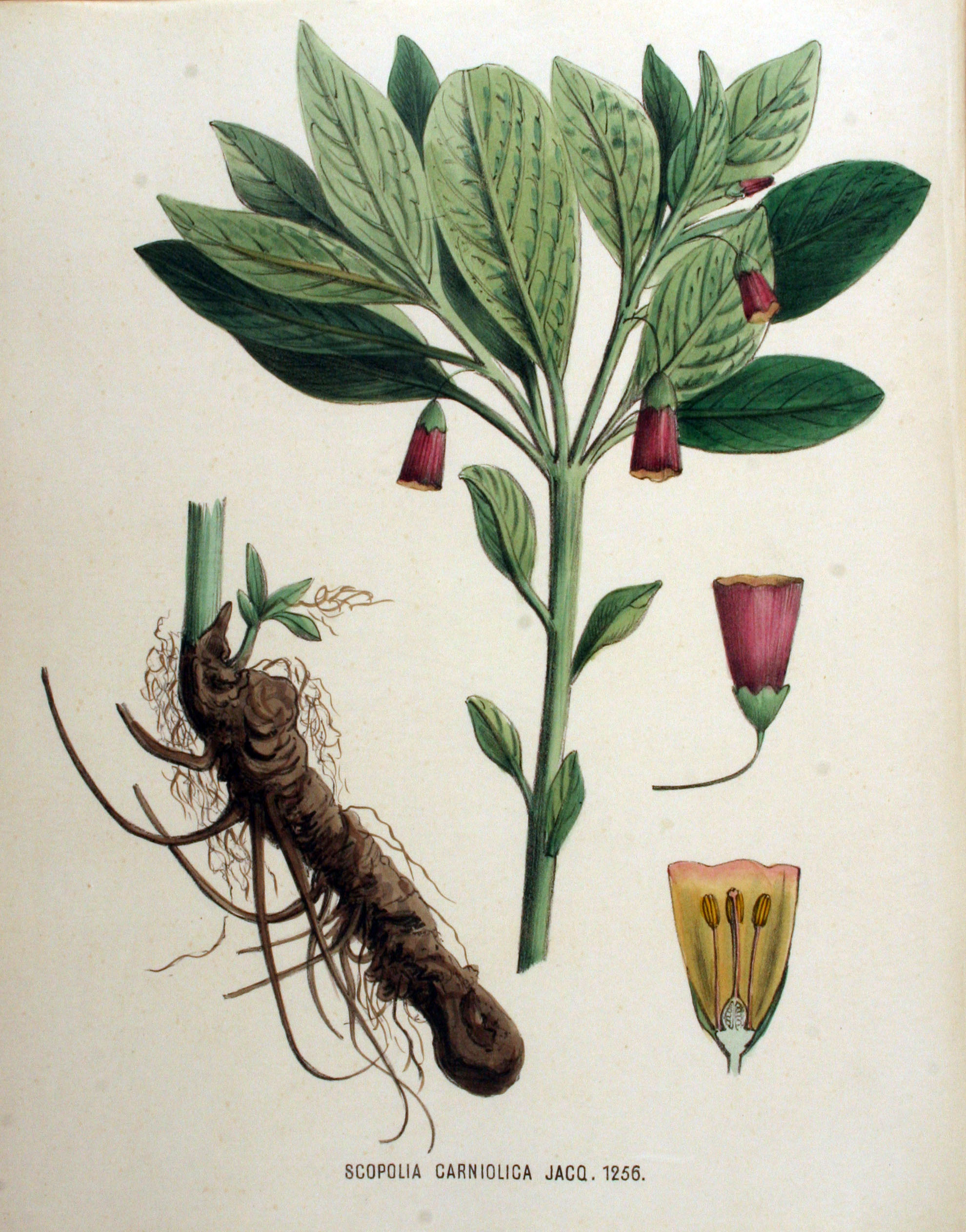
Rhizome of Scopolia carniolica

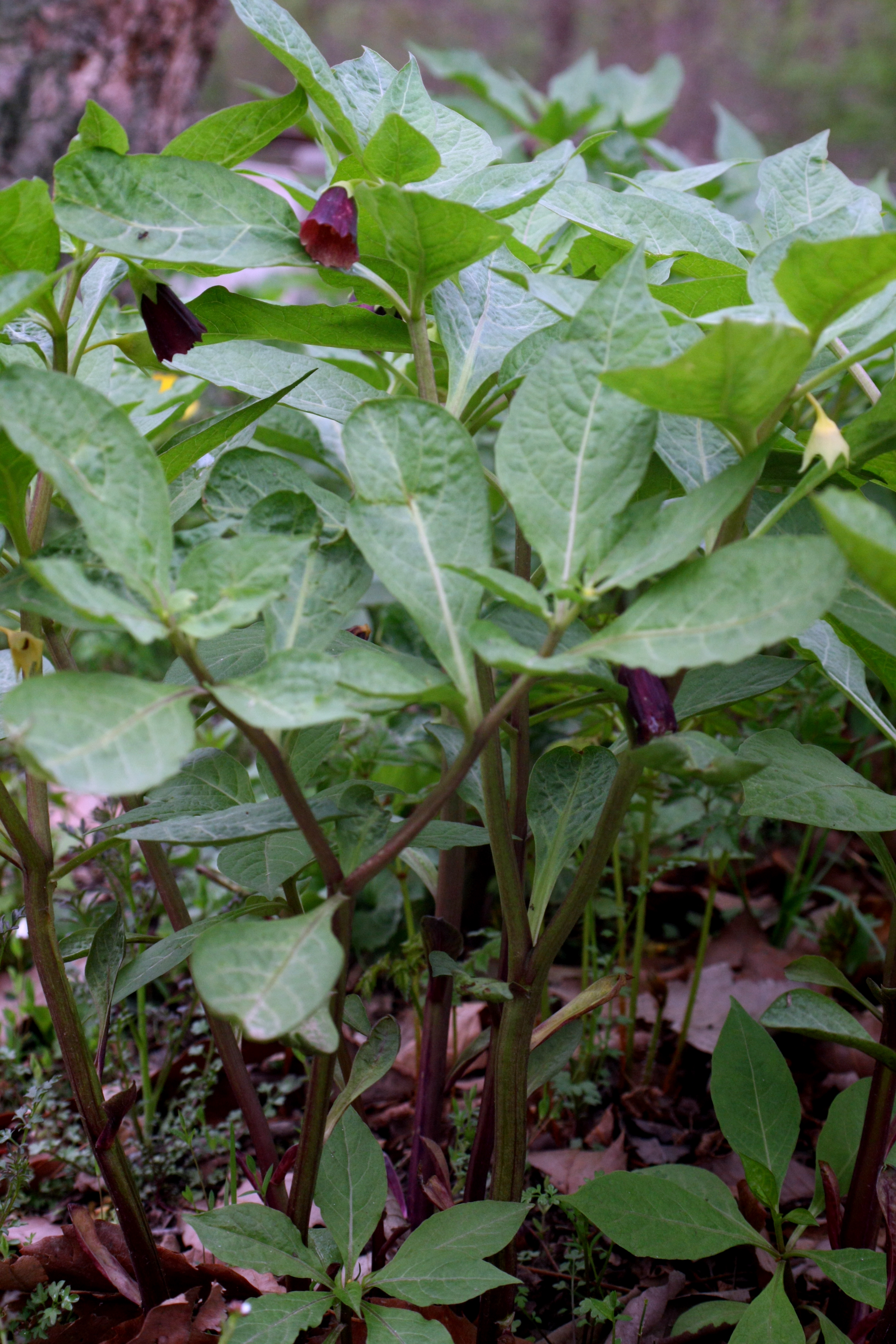
Scopolia japonica (Japanese: 走りどころ Hashiri-dokoro) in flower

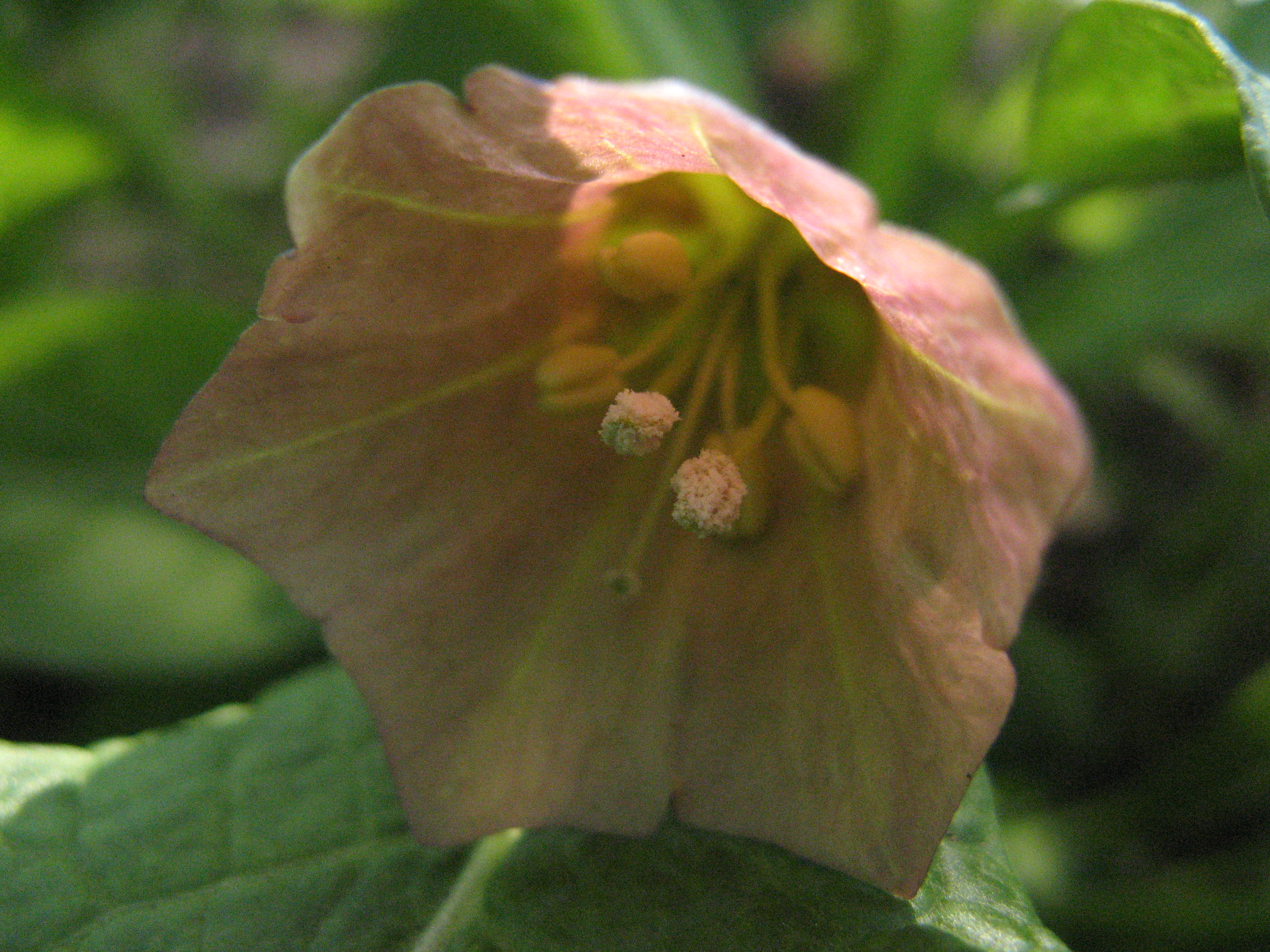
Single flower of Scopolia japonica showing dehiscence of ripe anthers

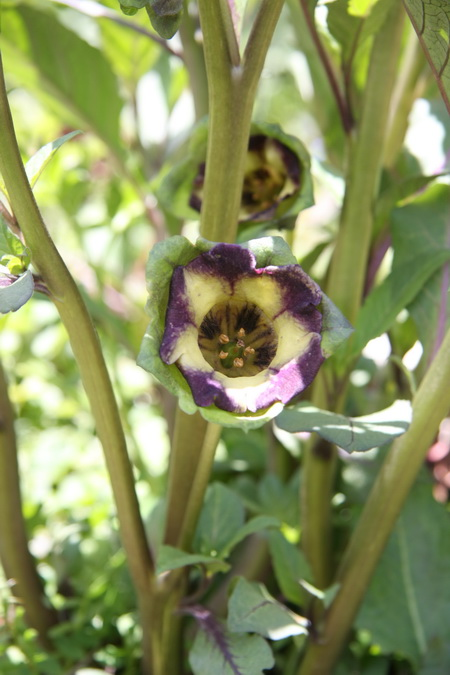
Anisodus tanguticus, showing interior of flower

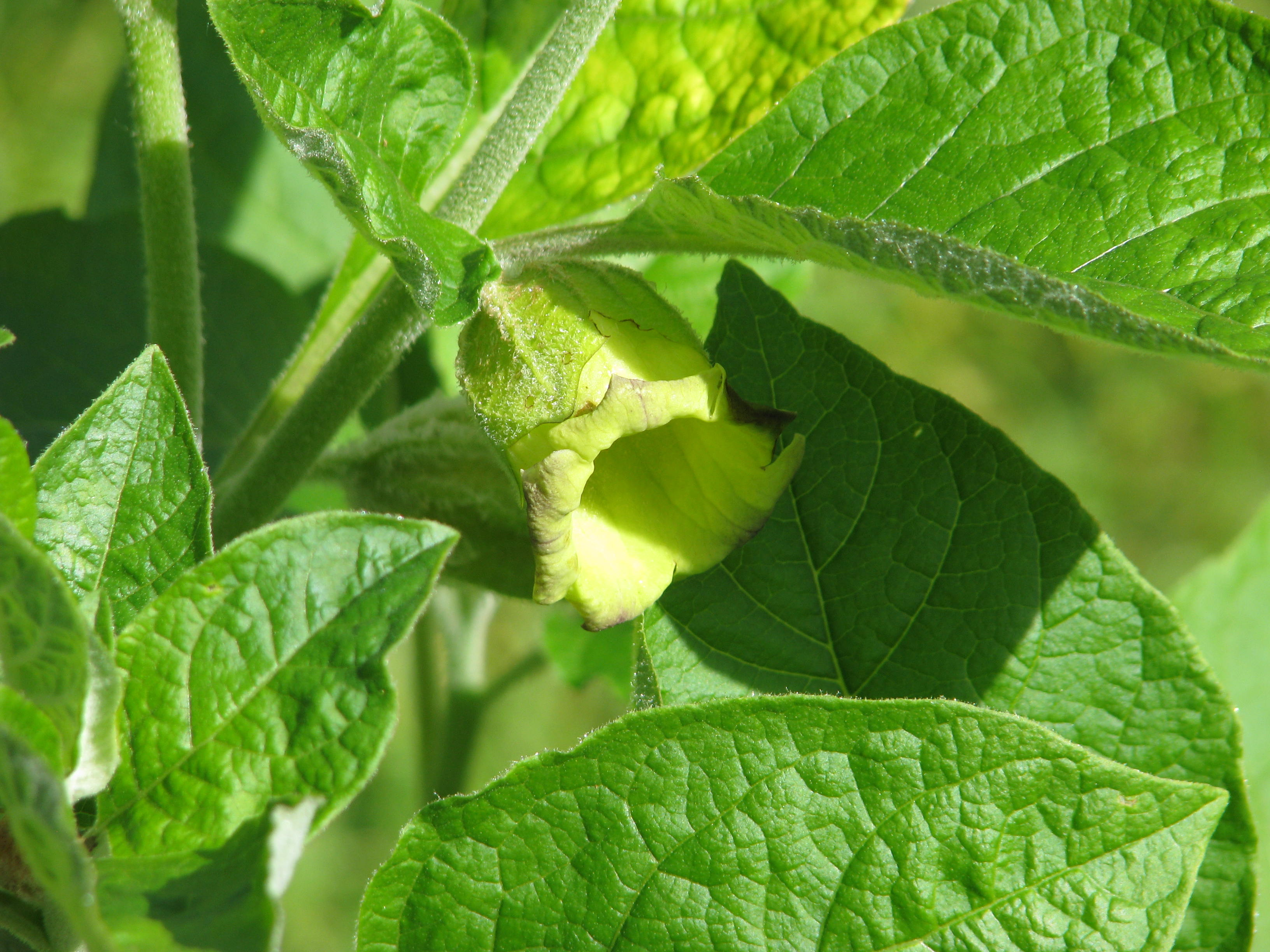
Flower and foliage of Anisodus luridus

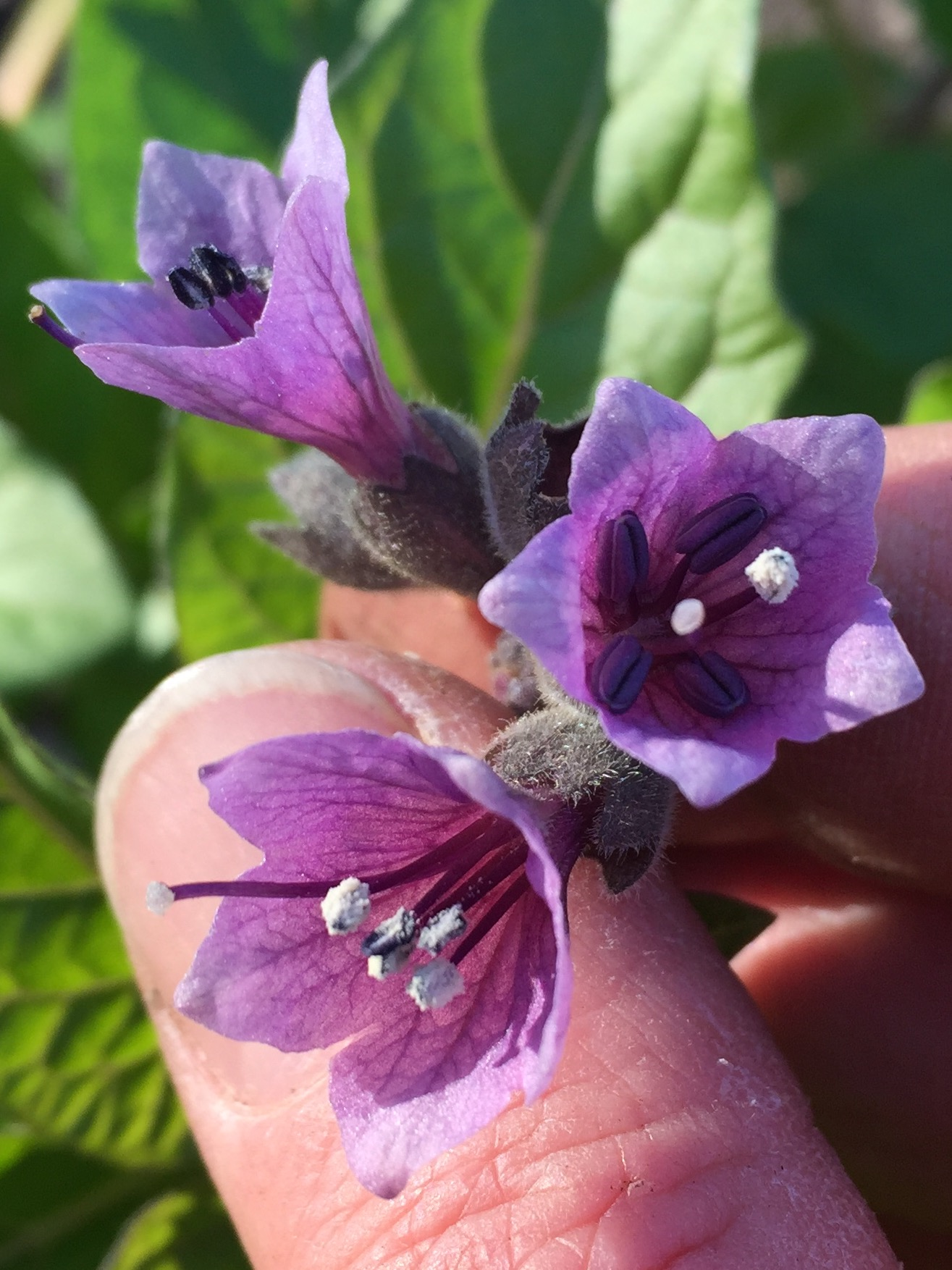
Flowers of Physochlaina orientalis

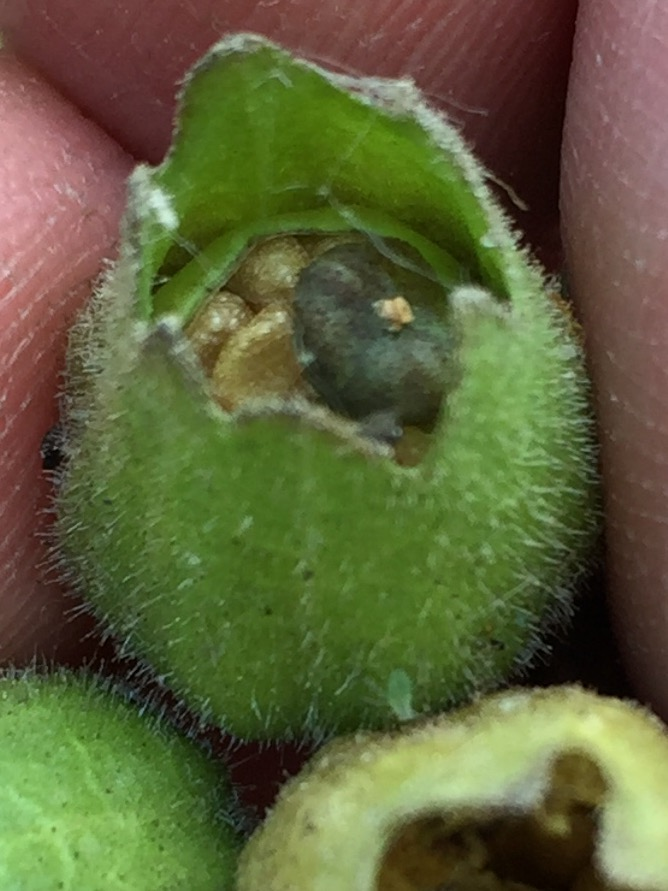
Interior of pyxidium of Physochlaina orientalis

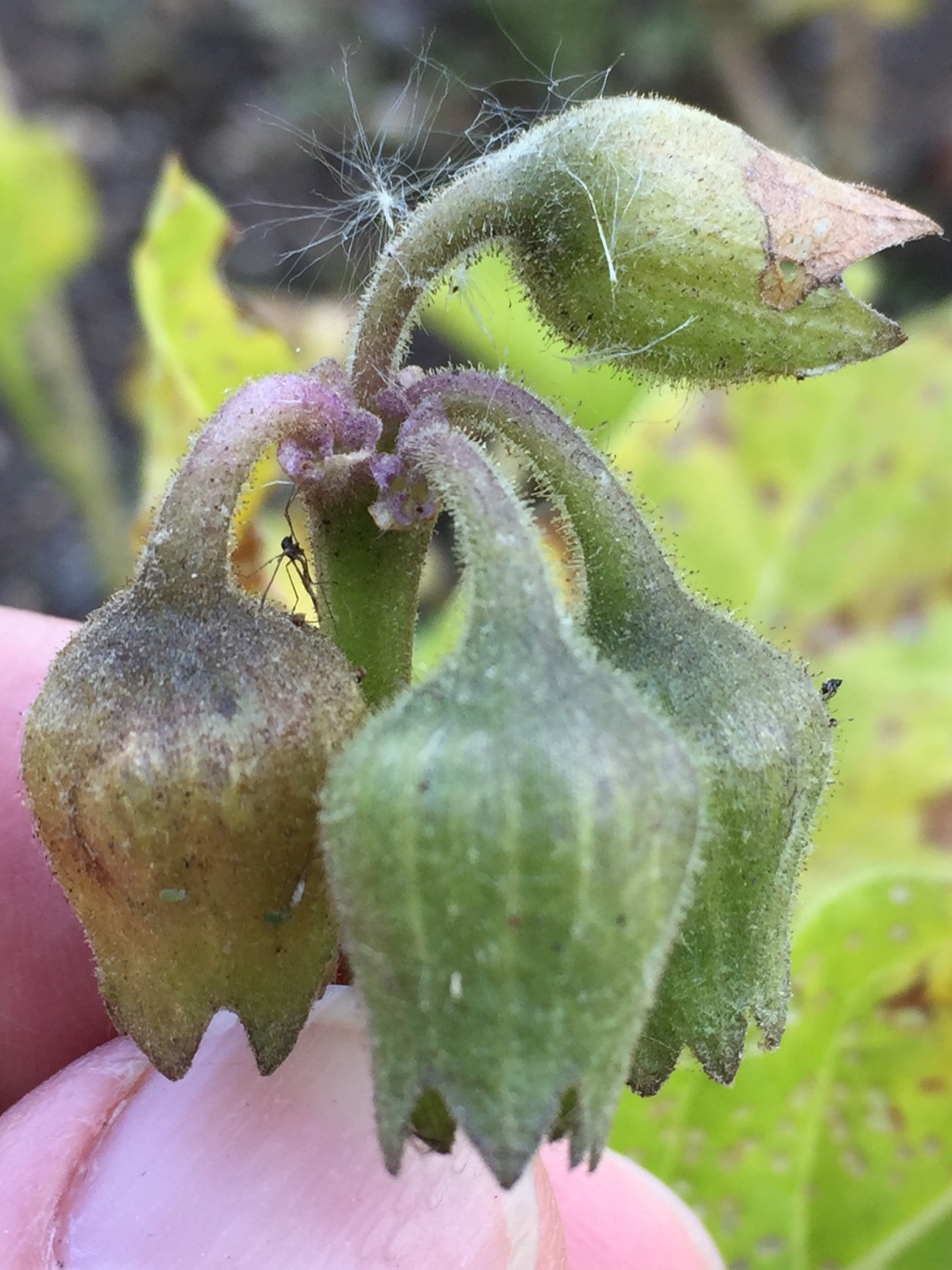
Ripe fruits of Physochlaina orientalis, showing nodding growth habit

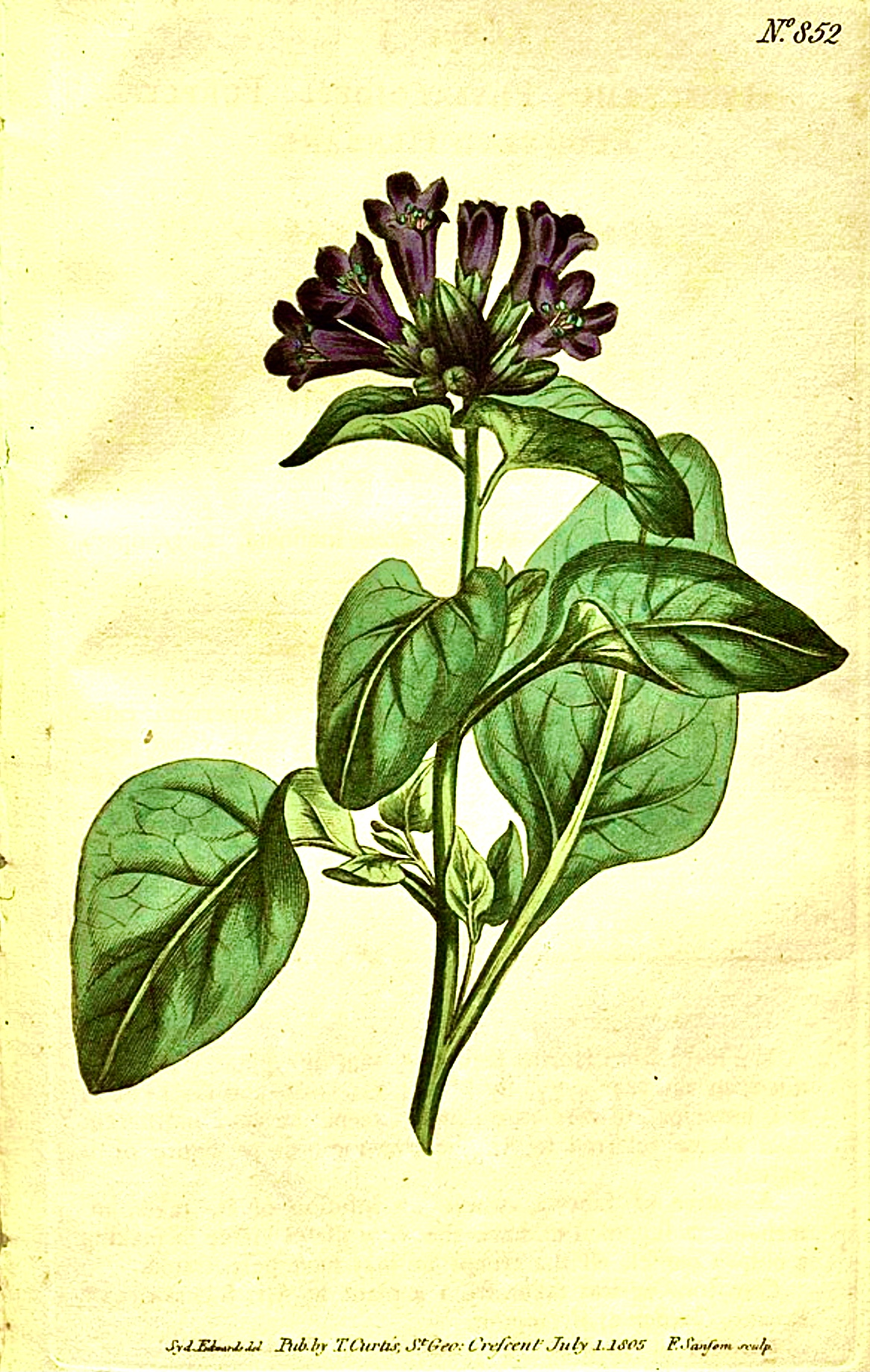
Physochlaina physaloides foliage and inflorescence (Curtis's botanical magazine)

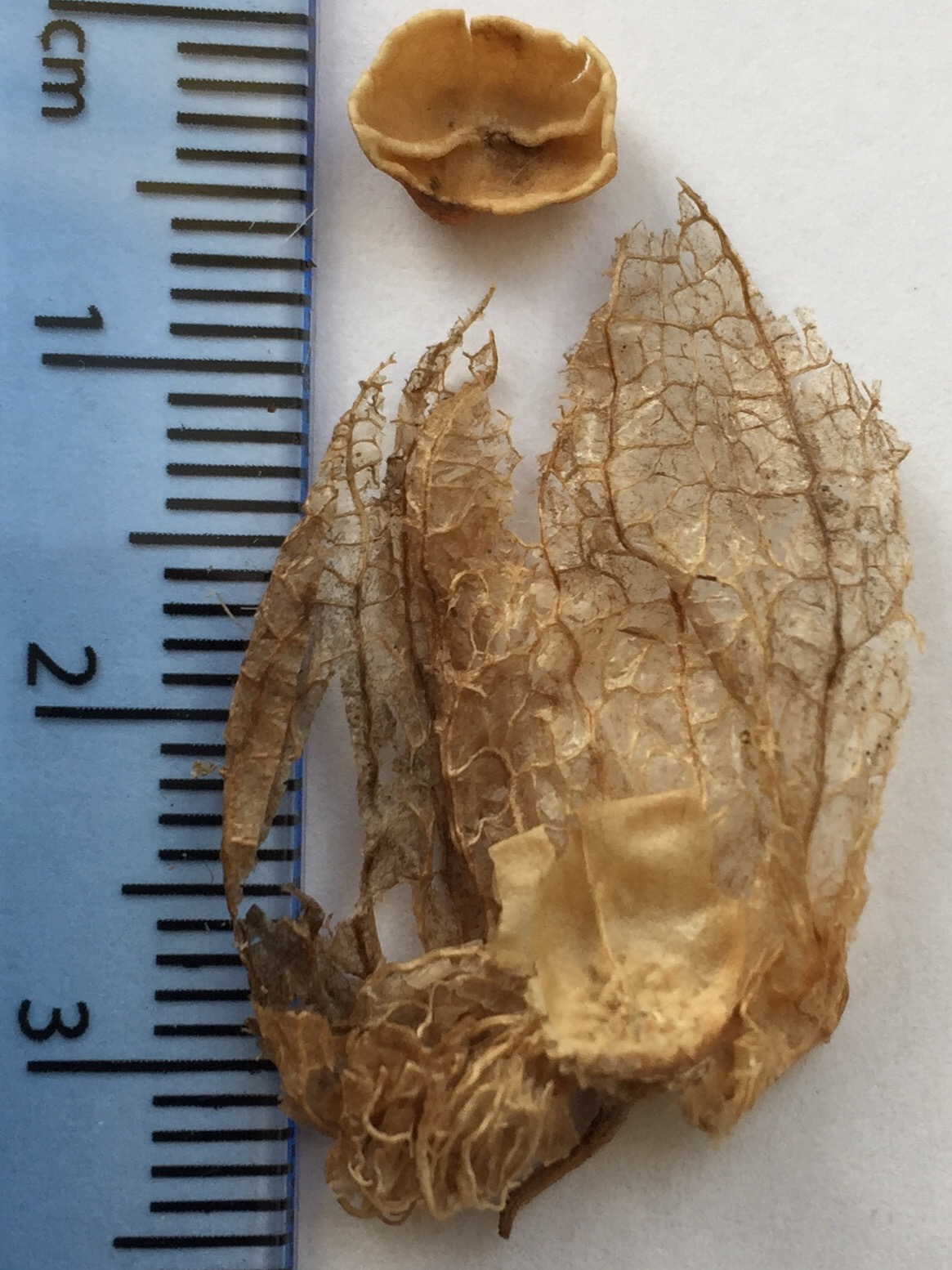
Dissected fruit of Physochlaina physaloides with detached operculum

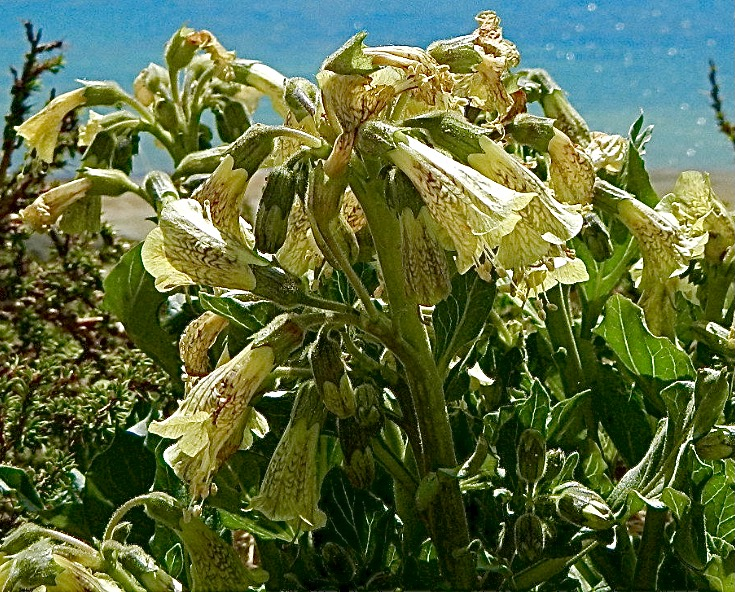
Physochlaina praealta foliage and inflorescence
