= Hermenegild Santapau =

Spanish born naturalized Indian Jesuit priest and botanist

- Born: 5 December 1903; La Galera, Tarragona, Spain
- Died: 13 January 1970 (aged 66)
- Occupation: Botanist
- Known for: Taxonomic research
- Awards: Padma Bhushan; Order of Alphonsus X the Wise; Birbal Sahani Medal
- Scientific career
- Author abbrev. (botany): Santapau

Hermenegild Santapau (1903–1970) was a Spanish born naturalized Indian Jesuit priest and botanist, known for his taxonomic research on Indian flora. He was credited with the Latin nomenclature of several Indian plant species. A recipient of the Order of Alphonsus X the Wise and the Birbal Sahni Medal, he was honoured by the Government of India in 1967, with the award of Padma Shri, the fourth highest Indian civilian award for his contributions to the society.

== Biography ==
He had a great knowledge of, and concern for, our plant wealth and wrote intensively on it for experts and laymen. May his memory long continue to inspire all those interested in our flora, said Indira Gandhi, hearing the news of Santapau's death.

Hermenegild Santapau (full name in his native Catalan, Ermenegild Santapau i Bertomeu) was born at La Galera, in the Catalan province of Tarragona, Spain, on 5 December 1903 and became a member of the Society of Jesus based at Gandia city in Valencia at the age of 16. He secured the theological degree of doctor of philosophy from the Pontifical Gregorian University, Rome in 1927 and reached India in 1928 to complete his regency. Moving to London, he graduated in botany with honours (BSc Hons) from the University of London from where he, later, obtained his doctoral degree (PhD) He also secured an associateship diploma from the Royal College of Science and another diploma from the parent institute of Imperial College of London.

From 1934, Santapau worked in Eastern Pyrenees and Italian Alps collecting plant specimens, for four years. After doing two years of research from 1938 at the herbarium of the Royal Botanical Gardens, Kew, England, he joined St. Xavier's College, Mumbai as a member of the faculty of Botany in 1940. He also served as an accredited lecturer for post graduate studies in botany at the universities of Mumbai, Pune, Agra and Kolkata. When the Government of India decided to revive the Botanical Survey of India, Santapau was appointed as the chief Botanist in 1954. He served at the BSI till 1967, holding the post of the director from 1961. He headed the Indian delegation to the tenth edition of the International Botanical Congress held at Edinburgh in 1954 and represented India at the International Standards Organisation conference of 1964 held at New Delhi. He was the leader of the delegation of botanists who toured USSR for three months in 1962.

Santapau returned to the St. Xavier's College, Bombay after his retirement from the Botanical Survey of India in 1967 and worked there as the rector till his death, aged 66, on 13 January 1970.

== Legacy and honours ==
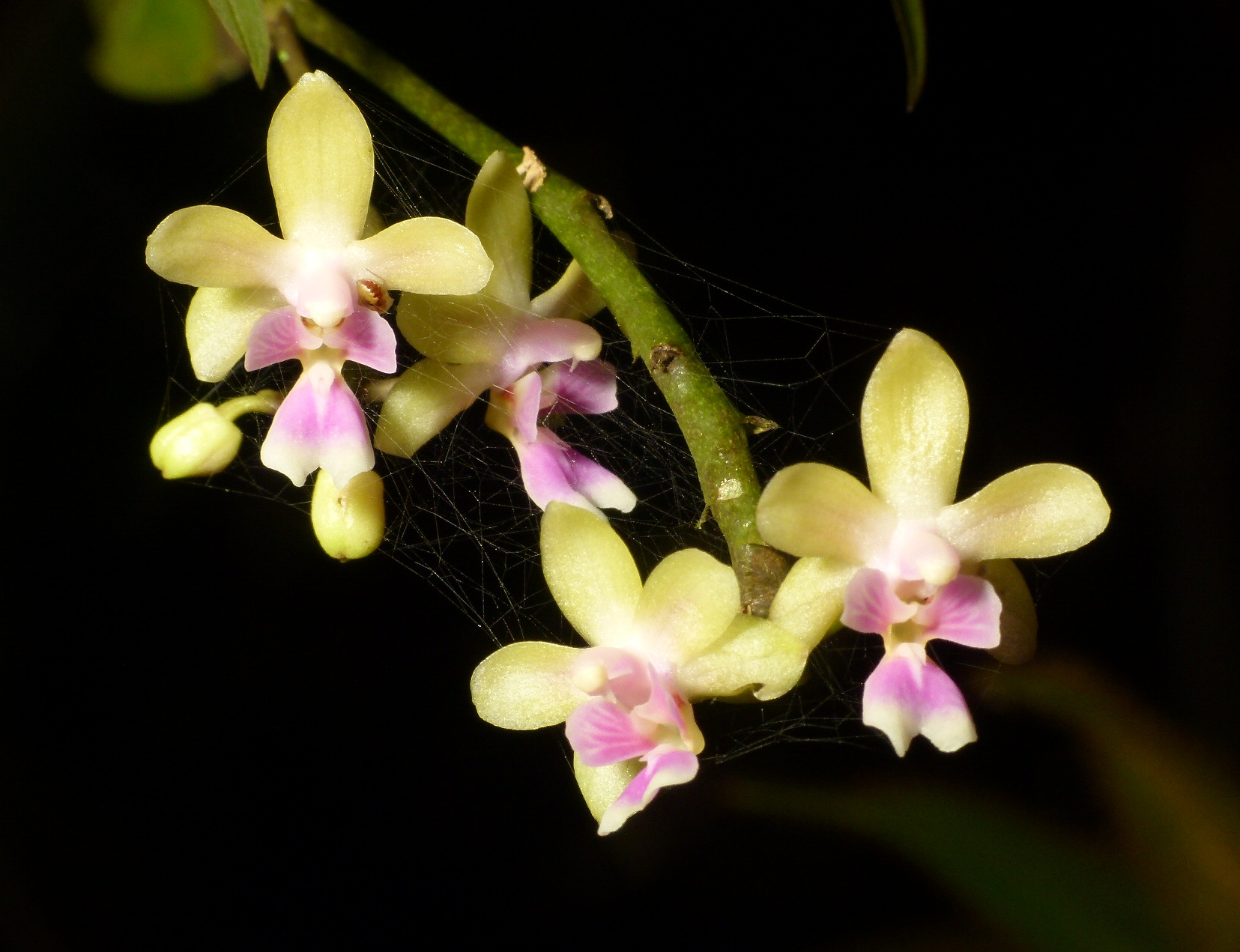
Oberonia santapaui, an orchid named after Santapau

Santapau served many government committees formed under the aegis of such organizations such as the Council of Scientific and Industrial Research, Indian Council of Medical Research and the Central Council of Indian Medicine. He was involved in the activities of the Bengal branch of the Royal Asiatic Society, Bombay Natural History Society, Indian Science Congress Association, Indian Phytopathological Society, International Society of Phytomorphology, International Association for Plant Taxonomy, International Association of Botanical Gardens and the Royal Agricultural and Horticultural Society of Bengal. He was a fellow of the Indian Botanical Society, National Academy of Sciences, India and the Linnean Society of London.

Santapau was known to have done extensive research on the Indian flora and was credited with the Latin nomenclature of several Indian species. During his career in India, he visited many parts of India and abroad, collecting specimens. Baluchistan, Kathiawar, Dangs forest in Gujarat, the Western and Eastern Ghats, Goa, Assam, Andhra Pradesh, Eastern Himalayas, Dehradun and Mussourie were some of the places he visited during the period from 1946 to 1967. His research findings in taxonomy are reported to have helped to popularize the discipline among the students and have been documented by way of 216 scientific papers and publications. Some of his notable publications are:

- The Flora of Khandala on the Western Ghats of India
- The Flora of Purandhar
- The orchids of Bombay
- The Flora of Saurashtra
- The Acacthaceae of Bombay
- The Asclepiadaceae and Periplocaceae of Bombay

Santapau is a recipient of the Order of the Alphonsus X the Wise award from the Government of Spain He was selected for the Birbal Sahni Medal in 1963 by the Indian Botanical Society. The Government of India honoured him with the civilian award of Padma Shri in 1967.

In 1965, 2 botanists published Pauia, a monotypic genus of flowering plants from Arunachal Pradesh belonging to the family Solanaceae and named in his honour.

== See also ==
- Society of Jesus
- Botanical Survey of India
- Pontifical Gregorian University
- Royal College of Science
- Imperial College of London
- Royal Botanical Gardens
- St. Xavier's College, Mumbai
- International Botanical Congress
