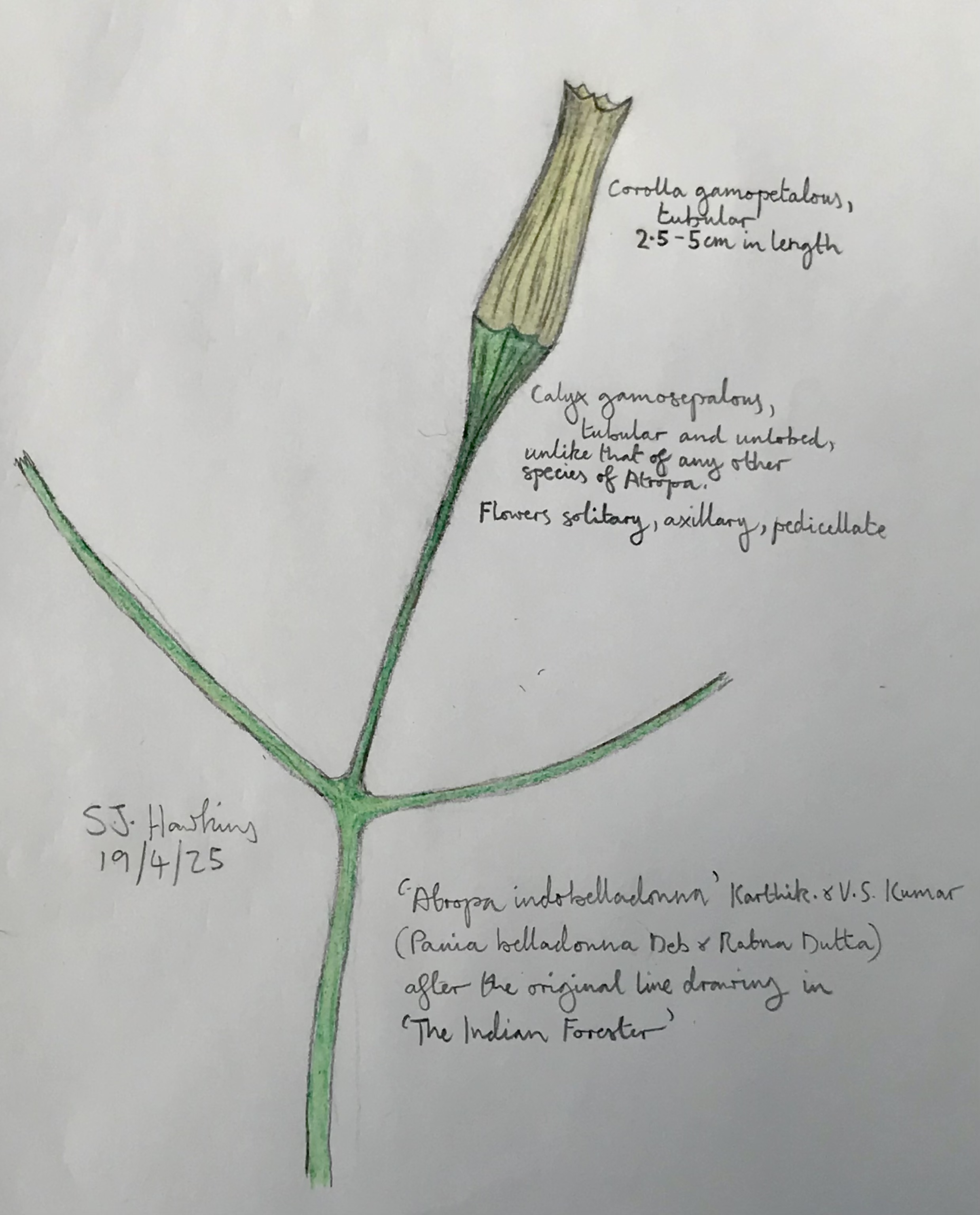

Scientific classification
- Kingdom: Plantae
- Clade: Tracheophytes
- Clade: Angiosperms
- Clade: Eudicots
- Clade: Asterids
- Order: Solanales
- Family: Solanaceae
- Genus: Atropa
- Species: A. indobelladonna

Binomial name
- Atropa indobelladonna Karthik. & V.S.Kumar (2020)

Synonyms
- Pauia belladonna Deb & Ratna Dutta (1965)

= Atropa indobelladonna =

Genus of plants

Atropa indobelladonna is a species of flowering plant belonging to the family Solanaceae. It is native to the state of Arunachal Pradesh in the eastern Himalayas of India.

The species was first described in 1965 and placed in the monotypic genus Pauia as Pauia belladonna, published in Indian Forester Vol.91 on page 363. The name Pauia was in honour of Hermenegild Santapau (1903–1970), a Spanish born naturalized Indian Jesuit priest and botanist.
The Latin specific epithet belladonna in the original binomial Pauia belladonna, refers (as Deb and Dutta make plain in their paper in The Indian Forester), not to the European Atropa belladonna but to its close relative Indian belladonna i.e. Atropa acuminata, in acknowledgement of a degree of similarity between that species and the newly described plant for which they were creating the new genus Pauia. In the year 2020 the monotypic genus Pauia was subsumed in the genus Atropa, and its sole species renamed Atropa indobelladonna - with the specific name indobelladonna acknowledging the (above-mentioned) measure of similarity to Atropa acuminata.
