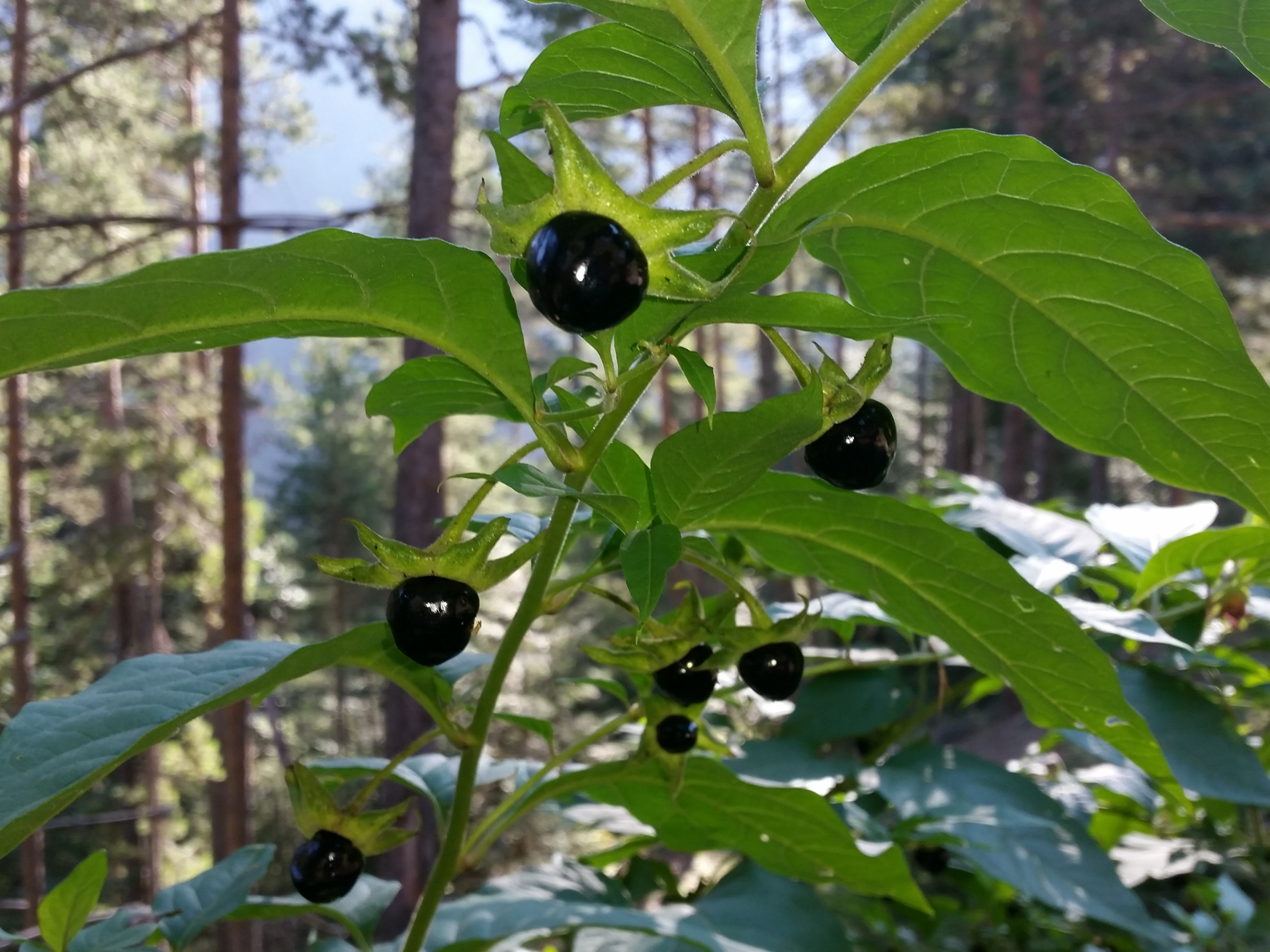

Scientific classification
- Kingdom: Plantae
- Clade: Tracheophytes
- Clade: Angiosperms
- Clade: Eudicots
- Clade: Asterids
- Order: Solanales
- Family: Solanaceae
- Subfamily: Solanoideae
- Tribe: Hyoscyameae
- Genus: Atropa; L. (1753)

Species
- 6, see text

Synonyms
- Belladona Mill. (1754), nom. superfl.; Pauia Deb & Ratna Dutta (1965)

= Atropa =

Genus of plants

Atropa is a genus of flowering plants in the nightshade family, Solanaceae: tall, calcicole, herbaceous perennials (rhizomatous hemicryptophytes), bearing large leaves and glossy berries particularly dangerous to children, due to their combination of an attractive, cherry-like appearance with a high toxicity. Atropa species favour temperate climates and alkaline soils, often growing in light shade in woodland environments associated with limestone hills and mountains. Their seeds can remain viable in the soil for long periods, germinating when the soil of sites in which plants once grew (but from which plants have long been absent) is disturbed by human activity or by natural causes, e.g. the windthrow of trees (a property shared by the seeds of other Solanaceae in tribe Hyoscyameae e.g. those of Hyoscyamus spp., the henbanes). The best-known member of the genus Atropa is deadly nightshade (A. belladonna) – the poisonous plant par excellence in the minds of many. The pharmacologically active ingredients of Atropa species include atropine, scopolamine, and hyoscyamine, all tropane alkaloids having anticholinergic, deliriant, antispasmodic and mydriatic properties. The genus is named for Άτροπος (Atropos) – lit. 'she who may not be turned (aside)' – one of the Three Fates and cutter of the thread of life / bringer of death – in reference to the extreme toxicity of A.belladonna and its fellow species – of which four others are currently accepted.

In some older classifications, the mandrake (Mandragora officinarum) has been placed in the genus Atropa, under the binomial Atropa mandragora.

== Species ==
Six species and one natural hybrid are accepted.

- Atropa acuminata Royle ex Lindl. – Indian belladonna/maitbrand (Kashmir and adjoining regions of India, Pakistan and Afghanistan, also N. Iran). Endangered.
- Atropa baetica Willk. – Andalusian belladonna / tabaco gordo / tabba (S. and S.E. Spain and W. North Africa). Endangered.
- Atropa belladonna L. – Belladonna/deadly nightshade (Europe, West Asia and North Africa). A very variable species with a very extensive distribution.
- Atropa indobelladonna Karthik. & V.S.Kumar – Arunachal Pradesh in the eastern Himalayas
- Atropa komarovii Blin.& Shalyt – Turkmenistan belladonna (Kopet Dag range dividing Iran from Turkmenistan and adjoining regions in N.E. (Caspian) Iran). Distinctive in that flowers borne singly.
- Atropa × martiana Font Quer (A. baetica × A. belladonna) – Morocco and east-central and southern Spain
- Atropa pallidiflora Schönb.-Tem. – Hyrcanian belladonna (Caspian Hyrcanian mixed forests, notably those of Mazandaran province, N. Iran, also Afghanistan).

The genus Atropa is currently under review, so changes in nomenclature are likely, once said review is complete. It will be seen from the above that there is an overlap in the respective distributions of A. acuminata, A. komarovii and A. pallidiflora in the lush Hyrcanian forests of Northern Iran, and it is possible that some or all of these species may yet be subsumed in the concept Atropa belladonna. A. belladonna itself (including its variety caucasica) is also present in the Hyrcanian forests and vol. 100 of Flora Iranica includes a useful key with which to distinguish the four species occurring in northern Iran. Data on A. pallidiflora and A. acuminata Royle ex Miers are neither abundant nor readily accessible on the Internet at present. The reported presence of an Atropa species in Mongolia is intriguing, given that country's relative remoteness from Kashmir and its (Kashmir's) well-attested population of Atropa acuminata Royle ex Lindl. The unequivocal presence of Atropa in the Eastern Himalaya would go at least some way to bridging the gap between Kashmiri and Mongolian populations of this genus. Some light might be cast upon this problem by the gaining of better knowledge concerning the rare and poorly-known species A. indobelladonna, found in Arunachal Pradesh and adjoining areas of Assam. This was first described in 1961 under the name Pauia belladonna, as the sole species of the monotypic genus Pauia, the specific name belladonna being bestowed by authors Deb and Dutta because of its partial similarity to Indian belladonna (Atropa acuminata Royle ex Lindl). In 2020 It was placed in genus Atropa, on the strength of evidence scant, to say the least, and somewhat at variance with the original anatomical line drawings of the species. No photographic images of the species are currently viewable on the internet.
