= Majda =

Name list

Majda [ماجدة] is a female given name, most popular in Slovenia, but also in some other areas of former Yugoslavia and Arabic-speaking countries (Egypt, Lebanon, etc.). It means, in Arabic, "the woman with glory". It ranks among the 30 most popular female names in Slovenia. It was most popular with women born between 1941 and 1970. Since the 1990s, only a handful of Slovenian girls have been named Majda.

It is a version of the name Madeleine.

It may refer to:

- Majda Burić (born 1979), Croatian politician
- Majda Koren (born 1960), Slovenian children writer
- Majda Mehmedović (born 1990), Montenegro Bosniak handball player
- Majda Potokar (1930–2001), Slovenian actress
- Princess Majda Ra'ad (1942–2025), Jordanian princess
- Majda Sepe (1937–2006), Slovenian singer
- Majda Širca Ravnikar (born 1953), Slovenian politician, journalist and art historian
- Majda Vrhovnik (1922–1945), Slovenian partisan
- Magda Sabbahi (1941–2020), or Magda, is an Egyptian film actress notable for her rôles from 1949 to 1969.
- Majida El Roumi (Arabic: ماجدة الرومي برادعي; born 13 December 1956) is a Lebanese soprano.
