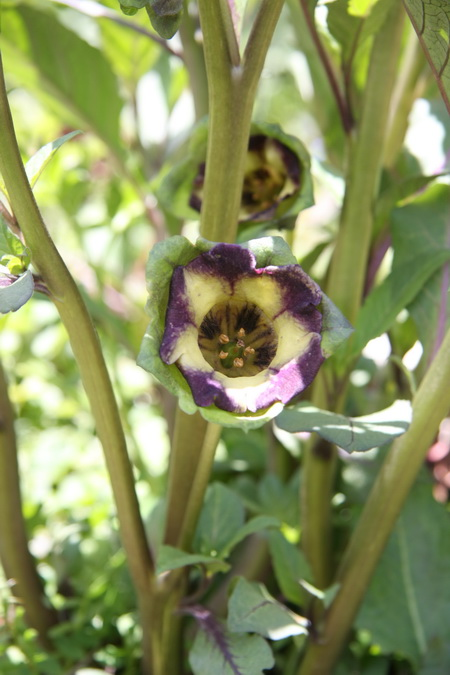
- Anisodus tanguticus in flower

Scientific classification
- Kingdom: Plantae
- Clade: Tracheophytes
- Clade: Angiosperms
- Clade: Eudicots
- Clade: Asterids
- Order: Solanales
- Family: Solanaceae
- Subfamily: Solanoideae
- Tribe: Hyoscyameae
- Genus: Anisodus; Link ex Spreng.

= Anisodus =

Genus of flowering plants

Anisodus is a genus of flowering plants in the family Solanaceae.

== Habitat ==
It is native to China, Tibet, India, Bhutan, and Nepal.

== Medicinal uses ==
One species, Anisodus tanguticus (Chinese: 山莨菪; pinyin: shān làngdàng), is one of the 50 fundamental herbs used in traditional Chinese medicine.

== Species ==
- Anisodus acutangulus C.Y.Wu & C.Chen
  - Anisodus acutangulus var. acutangulus
  - Anisodus acutangulus var. breviflorus C.Y.Wu & C.Chen
- Anisodus carniolicoides (C.Y.Wu & C.Chen) D'Arcy & Z.Y.Zhang
- Anisodus luridus Link ex Spreng.
- Anisodus tanguticus (Maxim.) Pascher

== Gallery ==
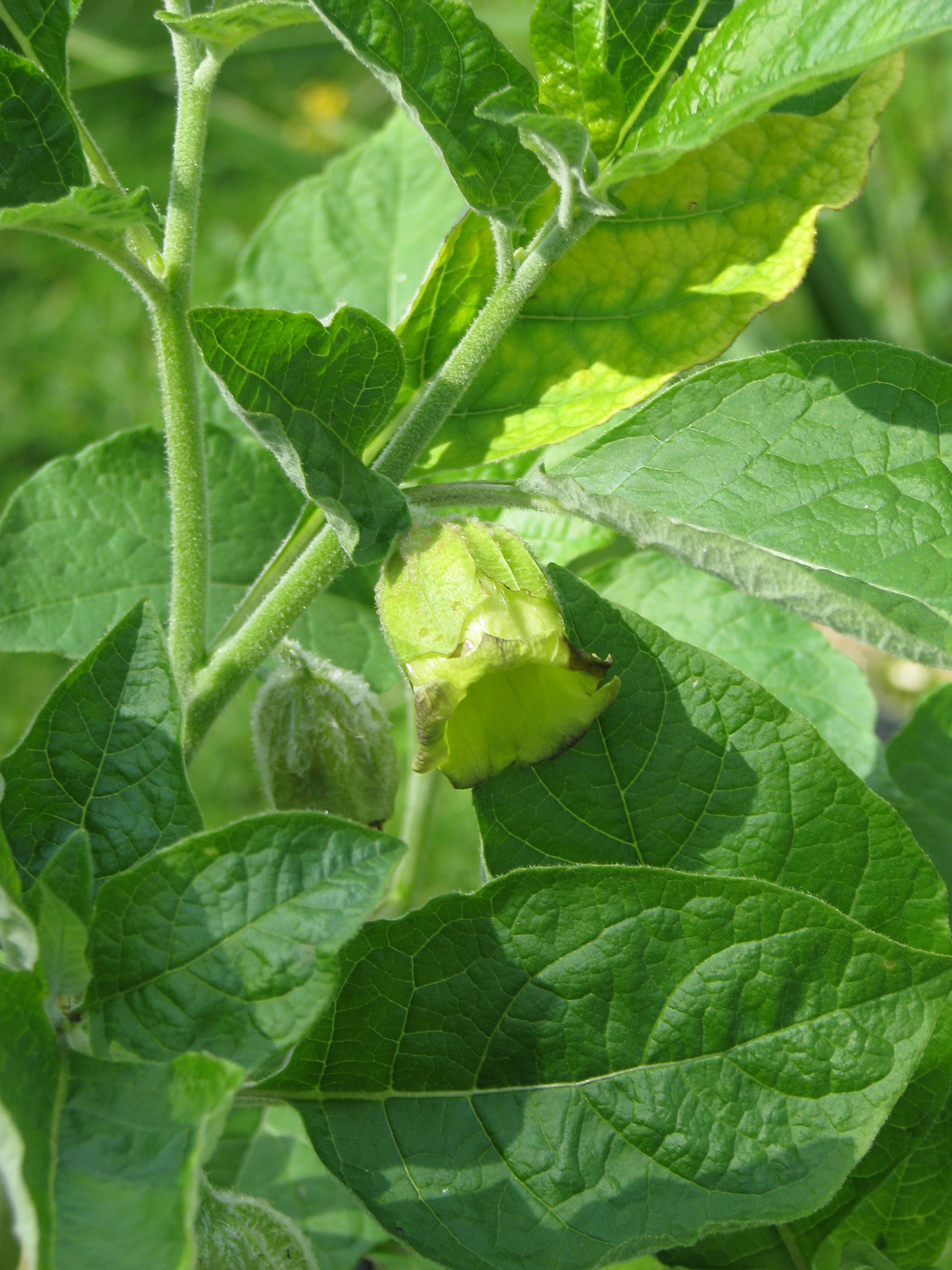
Anisodous luridus in flower

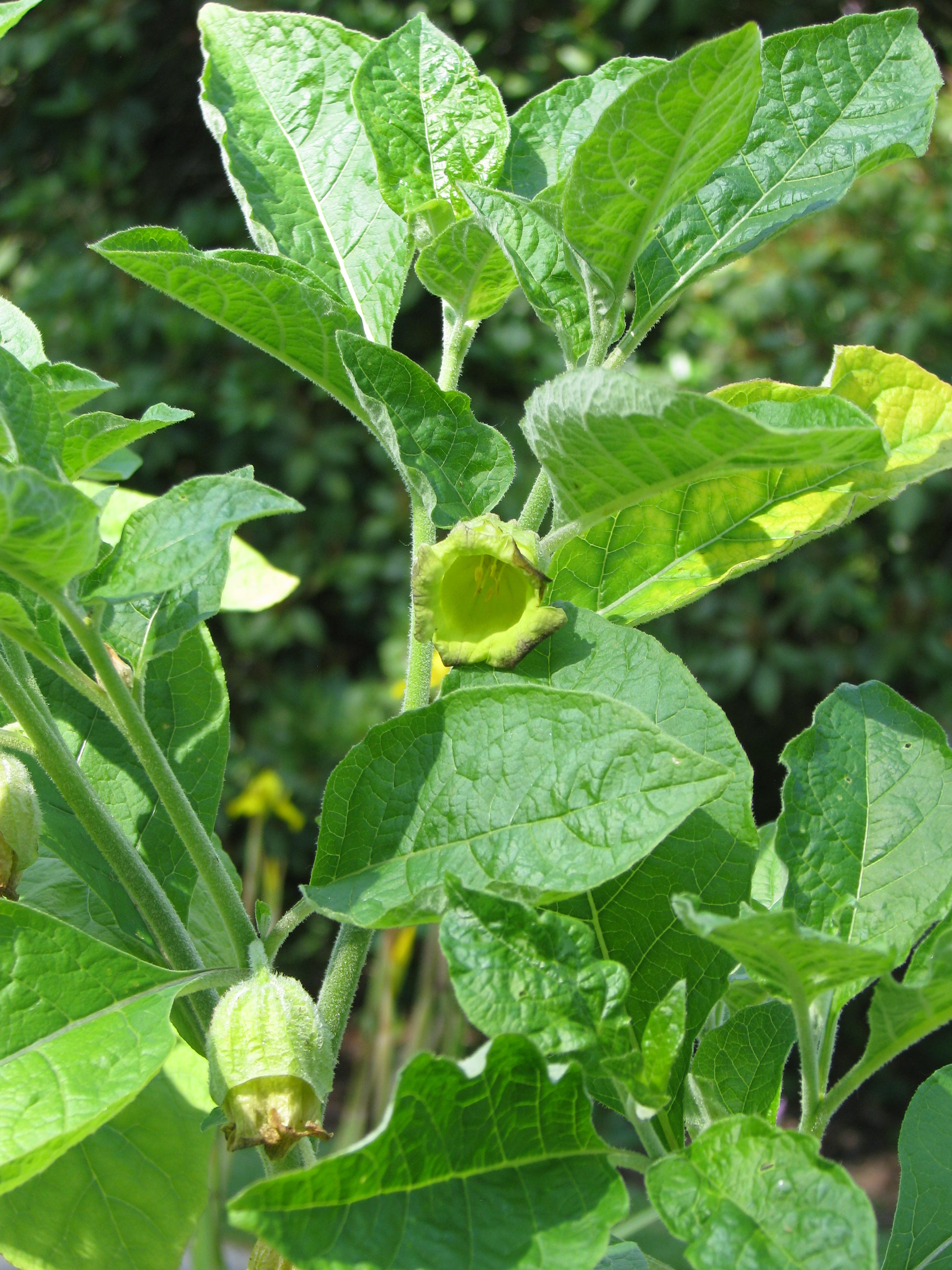
Anisodus luridus showing bud and interior of flower

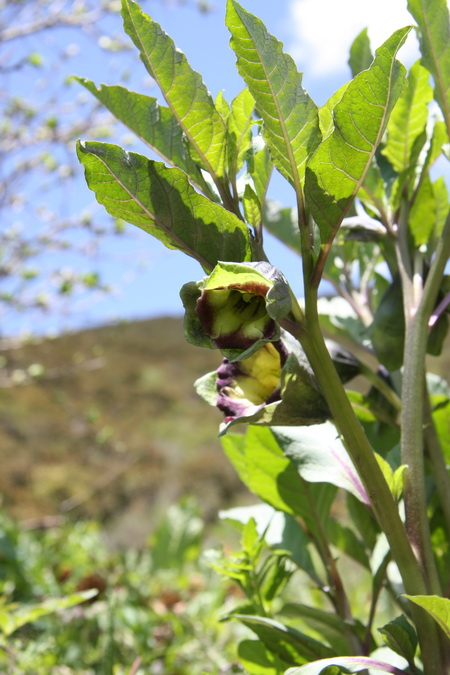
Flowering Anisodus tanguticus in profile
