= Przewalskia =

Scientific classification
- Kingdom: Plantae
- Clade: Tracheophytes
- Clade: Angiosperms
- Clade: Eudicots
- Clade: Asterids
- Order: Solanales
- Family: Solanaceae
- Subfamily: Solanoideae
- Tribe: Hyoscyameae
- Genus: Przewalskia; Maxim.

Genus of flowering plant

Przewalskia is a genus of flowering plants belonging to the family Solanaceae.

Its native range is western and central China, Tibet to eastern Himalaya.

The genus name of Przewalskia is in honour of Nikolay Przhevalsky (1839–1888), a Russian Imperial geographer and a renowned explorer of Central and East Asia. It was first described and published in Bull. Acad. Imp. Sci. Saint-Pétersbourg, séries 3, Vol.27 on page 507 in 1882.

Known species, according to Kew:

- Przewalskia shebbearei (C.E.C.Fisch.) Grubov
- Przewalskia tangutica Maxim.
