= Atropa acuminata =

Conservation status
- Endangered (IUCN 3.1)

Scientific classification
- Kingdom: Plantae
- Clade: Tracheophytes
- Clade: Angiosperms
- Clade: Eudicots
- Clade: Asterids
- Order: Solanales
- Family: Solanaceae
- Genus: Atropa
- Species: A. acuminata

Binomial name
- Atropa acuminata Royle ex Lindl.

Species of plant

Atropa acuminata, also known as maitbrand or Indian belladonna, is a close relative of deadly nightshade of Europe and North Africa and, like it, is an extremely poisonous plant valued in medicine for its richness in tropane alkaloids with anticholinergic, deliriant, antispasmodic and mydriatic properties. The specific name acuminata signifies acuminate i.e. 'tapering to a long point' - in reference to the distinctive shape of the leaves. Atropa acuminata is native to the Himalayas, being found in Eastern Afghanistan, the North of India and Pakistan : from Balochistan in the West to Kashmir in the East, in an area including also Himachal Pradesh, Uttarakhand (part of Uttar Pradesh until the year 2000) and Pakistan's Azad Jammu and Kashmir. The plant described under the name Atropa acuminata Royle ex Miers (which may be referable to A. acuminata Royle ex Lindl.) is found also in Eastern Iran and Mongolia.
