= 1-Methyl-4-piperidone =

Names
- Preferred IUPAC name 1-Methylpiperidin-4-one
- Other names N-Methyl-4-piperidone

Identifiers
CAS Number	1445-73-4
3D model (JSmol)	Interactive image
ChemSpider	66668
ECHA InfoCard	100.014.450
EC Number	215-895-5
PubChem CID	74049
UNII	W923NR2QCS
CompTox Dashboard (EPA)	DTXSID20162735
- InChI: InChI=1S/C6H11NO/c1-7-4-2-6(8)3-5-7/h2-5H2,1H3 Key: HUUPVABNAQUEJW-UHFFFAOYSA-N
- SMILES: CN1CCC(=O)CC1

Properties
Chemical formula	C_{6}H_{11}NO
Molar mass	113.160 g·mol^{−1}
Density	0.92–0.98 g/cm^{3} (20°C)
Boiling point	55–60 °C (131–140 °F; 328–333 K)
- Except where otherwise noted, data are given for materials in their standard state (at 25 °C [77 °F], 100 kPa). Infobox references

1-Methyl-4-piperidone (also known as N-methyl-4-piperidone) is a clear dark yellow liquid organic compound with molecular formula C_{6}H_{11}NO. It is the N-methyl substituted variant of 4-piperidone.

== Applications ==
1-Methyl-4-piperidone is used as a building block for a variety of pharmaceuticals, including:

- AC-90179
- Alcaftadine
- Anpirtoline
- Azanator [37855-92-8]
- Azatadine
- B777-81
- Bamipine
- BI-2536 [755038-02-9]
- BRL-54443 [57477-39-1]
- Cycliramine (not actual patented script method but still eligible, are using the precursor as for CTDP-32476).
- Danitracen
- DDD-016
- Diphenylpyraline
- Hepzidine
- HP-365 [59142-29-9]
- HT 3261
- Ketotifen
- Latrepirdine, maritupirdine, and dorastine
- Lifibrate
- Loratadine
- Lortalamine
- Lu 20-089, Lu 21-018, Lu 21-120, Lu 22-135, Lu 24-003, Lu 24-004, Lu 33-083, Lu 21-131, Lu 24-001, Lu 24-014, Lu 24-015, Lu 24-016, Lu 22-117, Lu 24-013, Lu 21-037, Lu 23-149. Patent:
- LY-334370
- Mebhydrolin
- Medipine (c.f. budipine and prodipine)
- ML352 [1649450-12-3]
- MPPP
- Naratriptan
- Paridocaine [7162-37-0]
- Picenadol
- Pimavanserin
- Pimethixene, clopipazan, Lu 14-089, Lu 12-312, and P 344 [63834-14-0].
- Piperylone
- RL71 [1195795-93-7]
- SN-22
- Thenalidine
- Tienocarbine
- Tubastatin A [1252003-15-8] TFA salt: [1239262-52-2]
- Enpiperate and parapenzolate
- Propiverine and pentapiperide [7009-54-3]
- UMB103
- RS 86 [3576-73-6]
- VU6001221 [2002495-17-0]
- EA-3834, EA-3580, EA-3443, EA-3580, EA-3443, CAR-302,196, CAR-302,282, and CAR-302,668
- Edoxaban

== Synthesis ==
The first synthesis of 1-methyl-4-piperidone was reported by Samuel M. McElvain in 1948. The method involves double Michael reaction between methylamine and two equivalents of ethyl acrylate, a Dieckmann cyclization (i.e. intramolecular Claisen condensation), saponification and decarboxylation.

Another synthesis uses methylamine, formaldehyde and the ethyl ester of acetonedicarboxylic acid.

A third synthesis consists of the ring closing of 1,5-dichloro-3-pentanone with methylamine.

== See also ==
- 4-Piperidone, the parent compound
