= EA-3834 =

Chemical compound

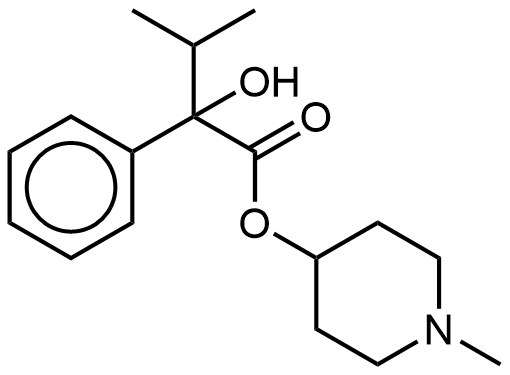

Identifiers
- IUPAC name: (1-methylpiperidin-4-yl) 2-hydroxy-3-methyl-2-phenylbutanoate
- CAS Number: 75321-25-4
- PubChem CID: 21150216
- ChemSpider: 20085385
- UNII: T4DW85YV8K
- CompTox Dashboard (EPA): DTXSID101028494

Chemical and physical data
- Formula: C_{17}H_{25}NO_{3}
- Molar mass: 291.391 g·mol^{−1}
- 3D model (JSmol): Interactive image
- SMILES: C1CN(C)CCC1OC(=O)C(O)(C(C)C)c2ccccc2
- InChI: InChI=1S/C17H25NO3/c1-13(2)17(20,14-7-5-4-6-8-14)16(19)21-15-9-11-18(3)12-10-15/h4-8,13,15,20H,9-12H2,1-3H3; Key:IFXNWEDGILPSBA-UHFFFAOYSA-N

EA-3834 is a potent anticholinergic deliriant drug with a fairly long duration of action, related to the chemical warfare agent 3-quinuclidinyl benzilate (QNB). It was developed under contract to Edgewood Arsenal during the 1960s as part of the US military chemical weapons program, during research to improve upon the properties of earlier agents such as QNB.

EA-3834 has a potency and central to peripheral effects ratio only slightly less than that of related compounds such as EA-3443, and is faster acting and shorter lasting, although not as much as other compounds such as 302196.

EA-3834 appears to cause renal problems, among them, microhematuria.

== See also ==
- CAR-302,668
- Edgewood Arsenal human experiments
- EA-3167
- N-methyl-3-piperidyl benzilate
- N-ethyl-3-piperidyl benzilate
- 3-Quinuclidinyl benzilate
- Ditran
