= CAR-226,086 =

Chemical compound

Identifiers
- IUPAC name: [(1R,2S,5S)-8-Methyl-8-azabicyclo[3.2.1]octan-2-yl] (2R)-2-cyclopentyl-2-hydroxy-2-phenylacetate
- CAS Number: 64471-85-8
- PubChem CID: 3049107
- ChemSpider: 2311303
- CompTox Dashboard (EPA): DTXSID401028493

Chemical and physical data
- Formula: C_{21}H_{29}NO_{3}
- Molar mass: 343.467 g·mol^{−1}
- 3D model (JSmol): Interactive image
- SMILES: CN1[C@H]2CC[C@@H]1[C@H](CC2)OC(=O)[C@@](C3CCCC3)(C4=CC=CC=C4)O
- InChI: InChI=1S/C21H29NO3/c1-22-17-11-13-18(22)19(14-12-17)25-20(23)21(24,16-9-5-6-10-16)15-7-3-2-4-8-15/h2-4,7-8,16-19,24H,5-6,9-14H2,1H3/t17-,18+,19-,21-/m0/s1; Key:LZCYWXGWYVKLRQ-JTJHWIPRSA-N

CAR-226,086 is a potent anticholinergic deliriant drug with a fairly long duration of action, related to the chemical warfare agent 3-quinuclidinyl benzilate (QNB). It was developed under contract to Edgewood Arsenal during the 1960s as part of the US military chemical weapons program, during research to improve upon the properties of earlier agents such as QNB.

CAR-226,086 was relatively poorly researched compared to other compounds in the series, but notably was found to have the highest central to peripheral effects ratio out of all compounds tested, even higher than that of other CNS-selective agents such as EA-3443.

== See also ==
- EA-3167
- N-Methyl-3-piperidyl benzilate
- N-Ethyl-3-piperidyl benzilate
- Ditran
