= CAR-301,060 =

Chemical compound

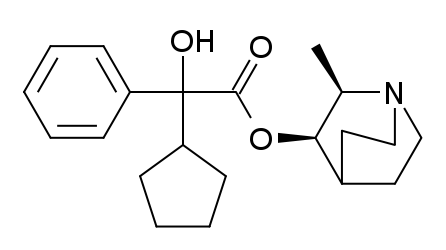

Identifiers
- IUPAC name: [(7R,8R)-7-methyl-1-azabicyclo[2.2.2]octan-8-yl]2-cyclopentyl-2-hydroxy-2-phenylacetate
- CAS Number: 153601-03-7
- PubChem CID: 44149220
- ChemSpider: 65323097
- CompTox Dashboard (EPA): DTXSID101028832

Chemical and physical data
- Formula: C_{21}H_{29}NO_{3}
- Molar mass: 343.467 g·mol^{−1}
- 3D model (JSmol): Interactive image
- SMILES: C[C@@H]1[C@@H](C2CCN1CC2)OC(=O)C(C3CCCC3)(C4=CC=CC=C4)O
- InChI: InChI=1S/C21H29NO3/c1-15-19(16-11-13-22(15)14-12-16)25-20(23)21(24,18-9-5-6-10-18)17-7-3-2-4-8-17/h2-4,7-8,15-16,18-19,24H,5-6,9-14H2,1H3/t15-,19+,21?/m1/s1; Key:ICYFZPARHUFDKQ-GAKLZJQJSA-N

CAR-301,060 (also known as cis-2-Methyl-3-quinuclidinylphenylcyclopentylglycolate or just by its code number 301060) is a potent and long lasting anticholinergic deliriant drug, related to the chemical warfare agent 3-Quinuclidinyl benzilate (QNB). It was developed under contract to Edgewood Arsenal, Fort Detrick,Maryland during the 1960s as part of the US military chemical weapons program, during research to improve upon the properties of earlier agents such as QNB.

CAR-301,060 was found to be slightly less potent than QNB, and with around the same duration of action, but with a very high central to peripheral effects ratio.

== See also ==
- EA-3167
- EA-3443
- CAR-302,196
- Ditran
