= CAR-302,196 =

Chemical compound

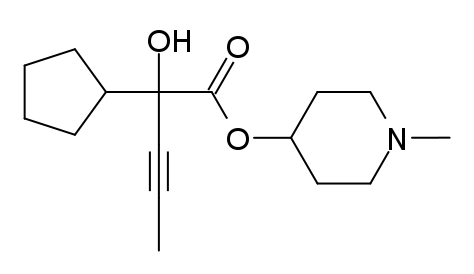

Identifiers
- IUPAC name: (1-methylpiperidin-4-yl) 2-cyclopentyl-2-hydroxypent-3-ynoate
- CAS Number: 53034-67-6
- PubChem CID: 198289
- ChemSpider: 171624
- UNII: TNG83KQW4H
- CompTox Dashboard (EPA): DTXSID30967536

Chemical and physical data
- Formula: C_{16}H_{25}NO_{3}
- Molar mass: 279.380 g·mol^{−1}
- 3D model (JSmol): Interactive image
- SMILES: CN1CCC(CC1)OC(=O)C(O)(C#CC)C2CCCC2
- InChI: InChI=1S/C16H25NO3/c1-3-10-16(19,13-6-4-5-7-13)15(18)20-14-8-11-17(2)12-9-14/h13-14,19H,4-9,11-12H2,1-2H3; Key:GKCPDYHGDHCIJL-UHFFFAOYSA-N

CAR-302,196 (also known as PCMG or just by its code number 302196) is a moderately potent and relatively short lasting anticholinergic deliriant drug, related to the chemical warfare agent 3-Quinuclidinyl benzilate (QNB). It was developed under contract to Edgewood Arsenal during the 1960s as part of the US military chemical weapons program, during research to improve upon the properties of earlier agents such as QNB.

CAR-302,196 was found to be only around 1/4 the potency of QNB, but its onset of action was much faster at only a few minutes, and the duration far shorter at only 2–3 hours. A fast-acting and short-lasting anticholinergic drug was felt to be more desirable for some applications.

== See also ==
- CAR-302,282
- EA-3167
- N-methyl-3-piperidyl benzilate
- N-ethyl-3-piperidyl benzilate
- 3-Quinuclidinyl benzilate
- Ditran
