= CAR-302,282 =

Delirant drug

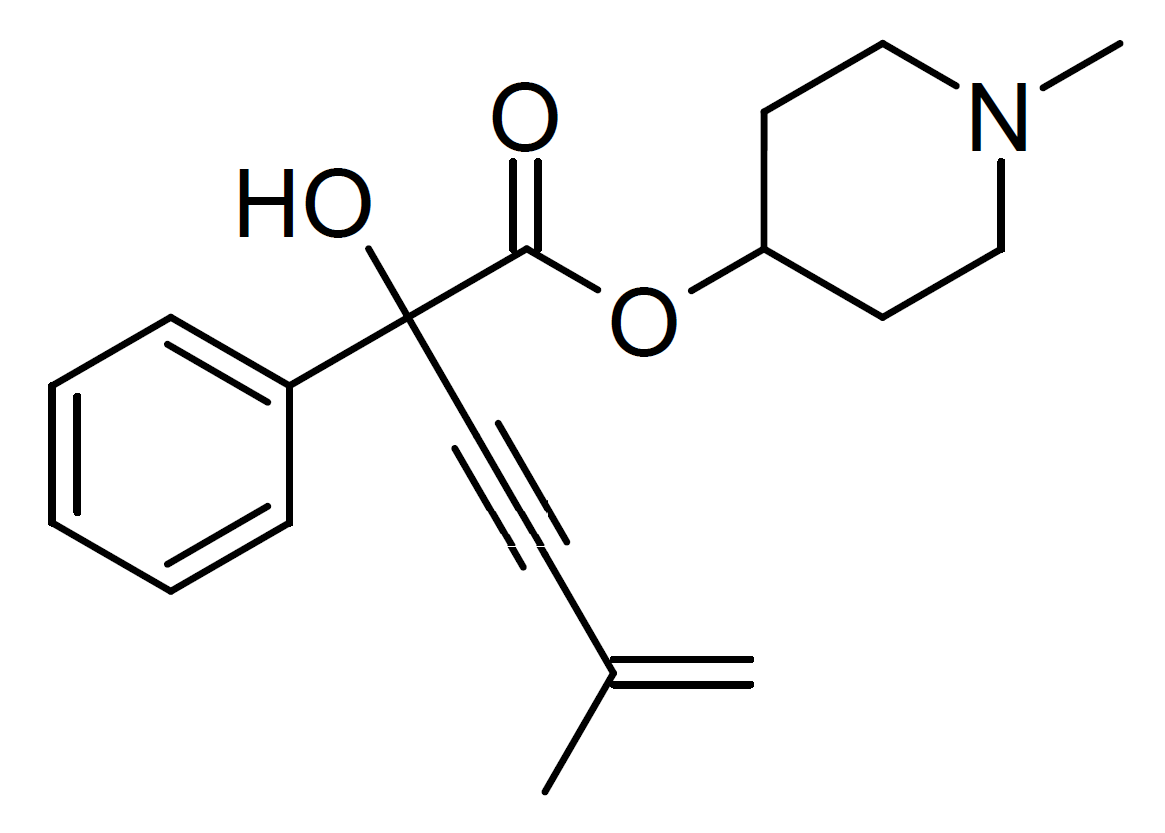

Identifiers
- IUPAC name: (1-methylpiperidin-4-yl) 2-hydroxy-5-methyl-2-phenylhex-5-en-3-ynoate
- CAS Number: 62869-67-4
- PubChem CID: 44183
- ChemSpider: 40202
- ChEMBL: ChEMBL1988426
- CompTox Dashboard (EPA): DTXSID401337048

Chemical and physical data
- Formula: C_{19}H_{23}NO_{3}
- Molar mass: 313.397 g·mol^{−1}
- 3D model (JSmol): Interactive image
- SMILES: CC(=C)C#CC(C1=CC=CC=C1)(C(=O)OC2CCN(CC2)C)O
- InChI: InChI=1S/C19H23NO3/c1-15(2)9-12-19(22,16-7-5-4-6-8-16)18(21)23-17-10-13-20(3)14-11-17/h4-8,17,22H,1,10-11,13-14H2,2-3H3; Key:HNFSQQPBCHYZKE-UHFFFAOYSA-N

CAR-302,282 (302282, NSC-263548, α-(3-Methylbut-1-yn-3-enyl)mandelic acid 1-methyl-4-piperidyl ester) is an anticholinergic deliriant drug, invented under contract to Edgewood Arsenal in the 1960s. It is a potent incapacitating agent with an ED_{50} of 1.2μg/kg and a high central to peripheral effects ratio, and a relatively short duration of action compared to other similar drugs of around 6-10 hours. Despite its favorable properties it was relatively little researched compared to more high profile compounds from the series such as EA-3167 and EA-3580.

== See also ==
- CAR-226,086
- CAR-301,060
- CAR-302,196
