= EA-3580 =

Chemical compound

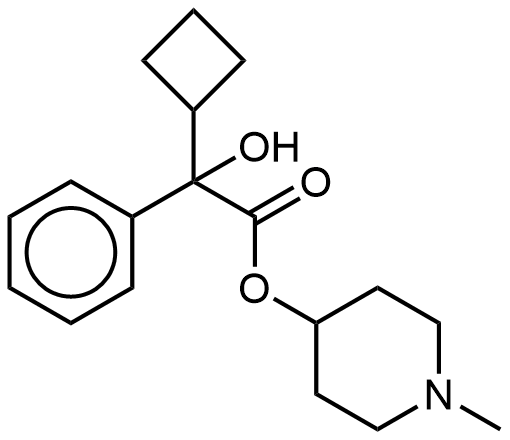

Identifiers
- IUPAC name: (1-methylpiperidin-4-yl) 2-cyclobutyl-2-hydroxy-2-phenylacetate
- CAS Number: 54390-94-2
- PubChem CID: 171342
- ChemSpider: 149791
- UNII: RF3SNA5PA2
- CompTox Dashboard (EPA): DTXSID30969510

Chemical and physical data
- Formula: C_{18}H_{25}NO_{3}
- Molar mass: 303.402 g·mol^{−1}
- 3D model (JSmol): Interactive image
- SMILES: c3ccccc3C(O)(C2CCC2)C(=O)OC1CCN(C)CC1
- InChI: InChI=1S/C18H25NO3/c1-19-12-10-16(11-13-19)22-17(20)18(21,15-8-5-9-15)14-6-3-2-4-7-14/h2-4,6-7,15-16,21H,5,8-13H2,1H3; Key:LOBGXFLATZQVKC-UHFFFAOYSA-N

EA-3580 is a potent anticholinergic deliriant drug with a fairly long duration of action, related to the chemical warfare agent 3-Quinuclidinyl benzilate (QNB). It was developed under contract to Edgewood Arsenal during the 1960s as part of the US military chemical weapons program, during research to improve upon the properties of earlier agents such as QNB.

EA-3580 is closely related to the similar compound EA-3443, and has similar potency and high central to peripheral effects ratio, but with a duration of action around half as long, although effects of EA-3580 can still persist for 24 hours or more following high doses.

== See also ==
- EA-3167
- N-methyl-3-piperidyl benzilate
- N-ethyl-3-piperidyl benzilate
- 3-Quinuclidinyl benzilate
- Ditran
