= C18H25NO3 =

The molecular formula C_{18}H_{25}NO_{3} (molar mass: 303.40 g/mol) may refer to:

- EA-3580
- CAR-302,668
- MDPEP
