= C20H29NO3 =

The molecular formula C_{20}H_{29}NO_{3} (molar mass: 331.45 g/mol, exact mass: 331.2147 u) may refer to:

- ADDA (amino acid)
- Ditran (JB-329)
- EA-3167
