= C20H23NO3 =

The molecular formula C_{20}H_{23}NO_{3} (molar mass: 325.408 g/mol) may refer to:

- 6,14-Endoethenotetrahydrooripavine
- Enpiperate
- N-Methyl-3-piperidyl benzilate
- Nalodeine
