= C21H29NO3 =

The molecular formula C_{21}H_{29}NO_{3} (molar mass: 343.46 g/mol, exact mass: 343.2147 u) may refer to:

- CAR-226,086
- CAR-301,060
- 25iP-NBOMe
- 25P-NBOMe
