= Tropine benzilate =

Anticholinergic

Clinical data
- Other names: Tropine benzylate, BAT, TB, #9447, BETE, BTE, Glykin, Glypin

Identifiers
- IUPAC name: endo-8-Methyl-8-azabicyclo[3.2.1]octan-3-yl 2-hydroxy-2,2-diphenylacetate
- CAS Number: 3736-36-5 stereochem unspec: 42487-29-6 HCl salt: 1674-94-8; 74051-39-1
- PubChem CID: 1138166
- ChemSpider: 16736072
- UNII: 3M2OLH58KE
- ChEMBL: ChEMBL1906907
- CompTox Dashboard (EPA): DTXSID70958468
- ECHA InfoCard: 100.125.953

Chemical and physical data
- Formula: C_{22}H_{25}NO_{3}
- Molar mass: 351.446 g·mol^{−1}
- 3D model (JSmol): Interactive image
- SMILES: CN1[C@@H]2CC[C@H]1CC(C2)OC(=O)C(C3=CC=CC=C3)(C4=CC=CC=C4)O
- InChI: InChI=1S/C22H25NO3/c1-23-18-12-13-19(23)15-20(14-18)26-21(24)22(25,16-8-4-2-5-9-16)17-10-6-3-7-11-17/h2-11,18-20,25H,12-15H2,1H3/t18-,19+,20?; Key:XXVZGWNHSCGMCT-YOFSQIOKSA-N

Tropine benzilate (also known as glipin, BAT or T.B.) is an ester formed between tropine and benzilic acid. Like its structural relatives such as atropine and scopolamine, tropine benzilate is considered a muscarinic antagonist, meaning it binds to and blocks muscarinic acetylcholine receptors in the nervous system and various tissues.

The substance was first described in 1936 and was shown to relax smooth muscle and block signals from the vagus nerve. It was also later shown to block stomach acid secretion in dogs.

It is a chemical deliriant similar to two related substances, namely 3-quinuclidinyl benzilate (aka QNB or agent Buzz) and CS-27349. However, BAT differs from these two agents in that it was never enlisted in a psychochemical warfare programme by Edgewood Arsenal (as an incapacitating agent) and is endowed with medically useful properties.

Another compound with which T.B. shares a striking similarity is called Tropenzile. T.B. sans the tertiary hydroxy group goes by name Tropacine.

Atropine and scopolamine (c.f. PC12047005) are natural alkaloids with a substantially similar structure to BAT, but differ in that they are formed from tropic acid and not benzilic acid. Tropic acid has a chiral carbon whereas benzilic acid is achiral. Whereas tropic acid is a natural product, benzilic acid is not known to exist in nature.

Tropine benzilate is less commonly sold as a tertiary amine, but is usually encountered as the quaternary amine Flutropium bromide. {It is worth making the distinction that although BAT can be used to make Flutropium bromide, one encounters the wrong stereochemistry about the bridgehead nitrogen when employing this method of synthesis. It is unknown what effect this would have on the resultant pharmacology. To make it correctly one has to use Norglipin [16444-19-2]. This same compound also finds use in the synthesis of Trospium chloride.}

Alpha-stereochemistry is used to make BAT which mimics atropine. Beta-stereochemistry would be more closely expected to mimic tropacocaine, although alpha stereochemistry is stronger. Compared to tropacocaine, it is not known if beta-BAT has affinity toward biogenic amine transporters, although this was not documented to have been reported in the literature.

== Synthesis ==
Tropine benzilate may be synthesized by reacting tropine with methyl benzilate in a transesterification reaction.

== See also ==
- Trospium chloride
