= C22H25NO3 =

The molecular formula C_{22}H_{25}NO_{3} (molar mass: 351.446 g/mol) may refer to:

- Tropine benzilate
- Tamibarotene
- CS-27349
