= C12H15NO =

The molecular formula C_{12}H_{15}NO (molar mass: 189.25 g/mol, exact mass: 189.1154 u) may refer to:

- 5-MAPB
- 6-MAPB
- 1-Benzyl-4-piperidone
