= Swords into plowshares =

Swords Into Plowshares may refer to:

- Swords to Plowshares, US nonprofit organization serving military veterans based in the San Francisco Bay Area.
- Swords into ploughshares, Converting weapons to peaceful civilian applications.
- Swords Into Plowshares (TV series), 2026 Chinese historical TV series set in the Five Dynasties and Ten Kingdoms period.
