= Cantil =

Cantil may refer to:

- Several different venomous snake species within the Agkistrodon genus
- Tani Cantil-Sakauye (born 1959), 28th Chief Justice of California
- Cantil, California, small town in the United States
- Cantil, an alternate name of the drug mepenzolate
- The Portuguese name of a certain type of wine bottle, more commonly known under its German name Bocksbeutel
