= CAR-302,668 =

Chemical compound

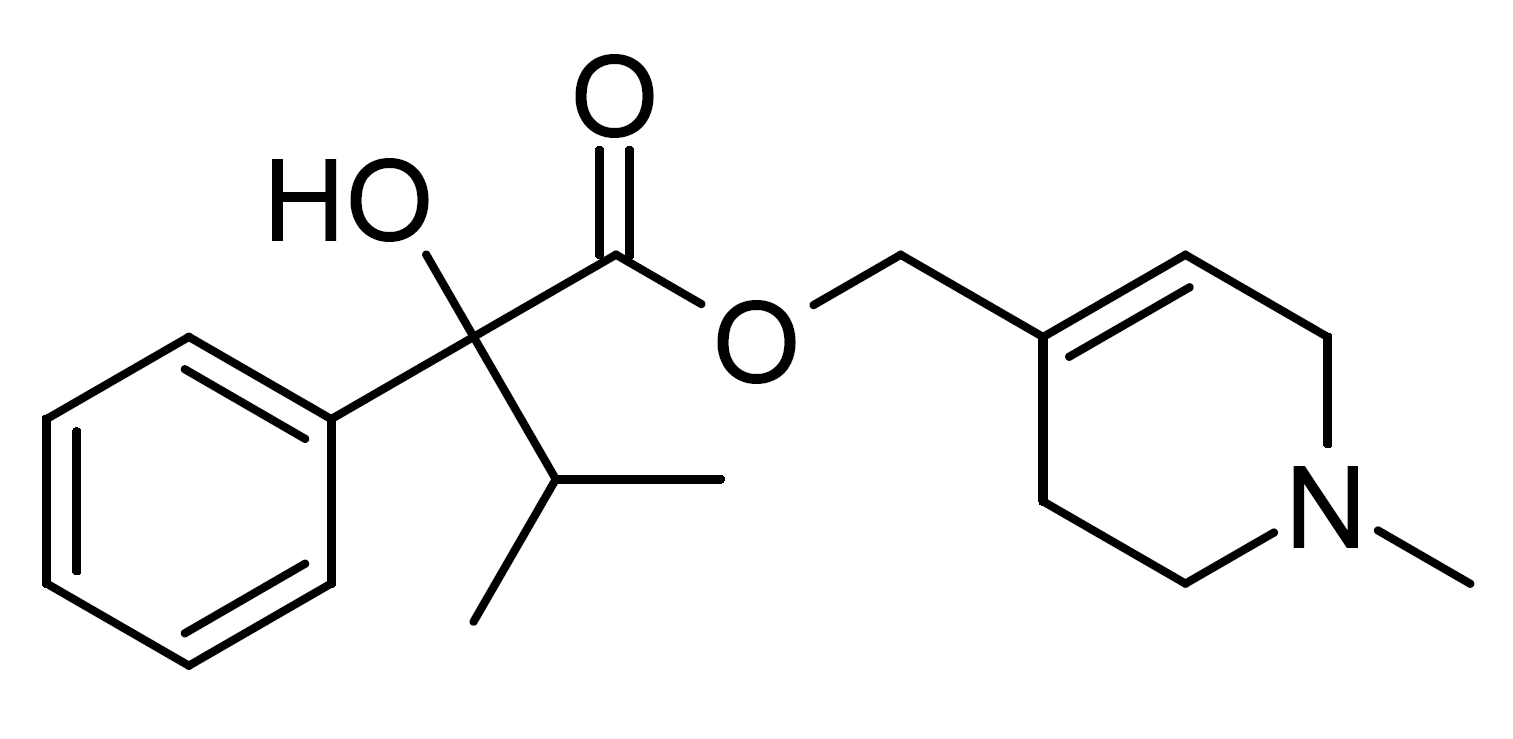

Identifiers
- IUPAC name: (1-methyl-3,6-dihydro-2H-pyridin-4-yl)methyl 2-hydroxy-3-methyl-2-phenylbutanoate
- CAS Number: 93101-83-8
- PubChem CID: 56556
- ChemSpider: 51020

Chemical and physical data
- Formula: C_{18}H_{25}NO_{3}
- Molar mass: 303.402 g·mol^{−1}
- 3D model (JSmol): Interactive image
- SMILES: CC(C)C(C1=CC=CC=C1)(C(=O)OCC2=CCN(CC2)C)O
- InChI: InChI=1S/C18H25NO3/c1-14(2)18(21,16-7-5-4-6-8-16)17(20)22-13-15-9-11-19(3)12-10-15/h4-9,14,21H,10-13H2,1-3H3; Key:VZCBERXKHILZBM-UHFFFAOYSA-N

CAR-302,668 (302668, α-isopropylmandelic acid (1-methyl-1,2,3,6-tetrahydro-4-pyridyl)methyl ester) is an anticholinergic deliriant drug, invented under contract to Edgewood Arsenal in the 1960s. It is a reasonably potent incapacitating agent with an ED_{50} of 4μg/kg and a long duration of action of around 16-24 hours.

== See also ==
- CAR-302,282
- EA-3834
