= DDD-016 =

Atypical antipsychotics

Identifiers
- IUPAC name: 5-methyl-13-thia-1,5-diazapentacyclo[10.8.1.02,7.08,21.015,20]henicosa-2(7),8(21),9,11,15,17,19-heptaene
- CAS Number: 1260506-25-9
- PubChem CID: 49839235

Chemical and physical data
- Formula: C_{19}H_{18}N_{2}S
- Molar mass: 306.43 g·mol^{−1}
- 3D model (JSmol): Interactive image
- SMILES: CN1CCC2=C(C1)C3=C4N2C5=CC=CC=C5CSC4=CC=C3
- InChI: InChI=1S/C19H18N2S/c1-20-10-9-17-15(11-20)14-6-4-8-18-19(14)21(17)16-7-3-2-5-13(16)12-22-18/h2-8H,9-12H2,1H3; Key:VBNQJCKPRLQJSO-UHFFFAOYSA-N

DDD-016 is a novel pentacyclic compound initially designed and synthesized as a potential atypical antipsychotic, with its receptor binding affinities screened across a broad panel of over 80 central nervous system and other receptors. As part of a series of investigational compounds—which also includes DDD-024, DDD-025, and DDD-029 stands out for its proposed anti-psychotic activity, believed to be mediated through dual serotonin 5-HT_{2A} and dopamine D2 receptor antagonism.

== Synthesis ==
DDD-016 synthesis

A Goldberg reaction between 2-aminothiophenol [137-07-5] (1) and 2-bromobenzyl bromide [3433-80-5] (2) gives 5,11-Dihydrodibenzo[b,e][1,4]thiazepine, [3048-78-0] (3). Nitrosylation with nitrous acid gives (4). This is then reduced to the amino group. Condensation with 1-Methyl-4-piperidone [1445-73-4] gives (5). Fischer indole synthesis completes the synthesis.

{Note that the Goldberg reaction is being replaced by the Hartwig amination.}

== See also ==
Rajagopalan also invented a highly novel antidepressant earlier in his career:
