= EA-3443 =

Chemical compound

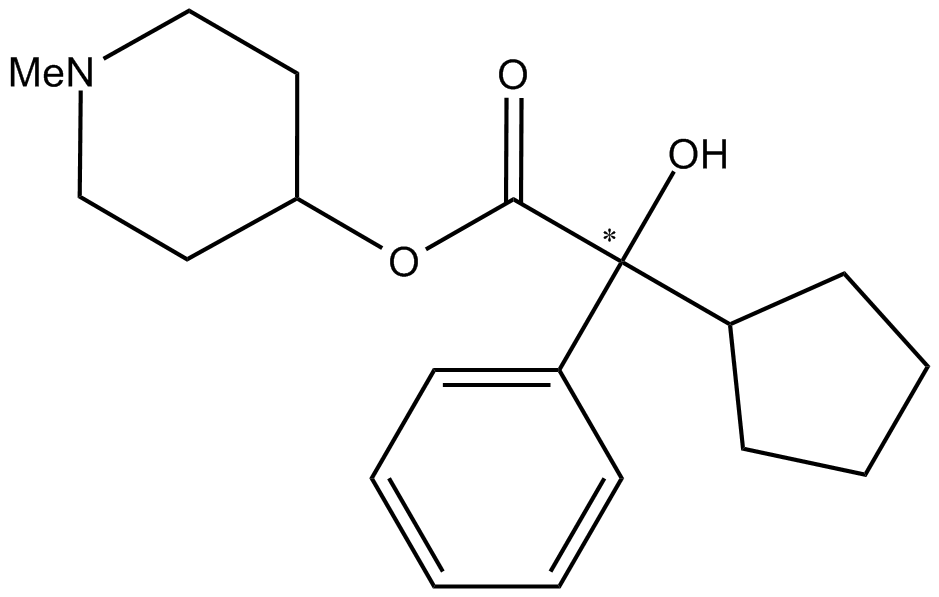

Identifiers
- IUPAC name: (1-methylpiperidin-4-yl) 2-cyclopentyl-2-hydroxy-2-phenylacetate
- CAS Number: 37830-21-0
- PubChem CID: 37838
- ChemSpider: 34695
- UNII: 90H2V46IP4
- CompTox Dashboard (EPA): DTXSID50958860
- ECHA InfoCard: 100.110.337

Chemical and physical data
- Formula: C_{19}H_{27}NO_{3}
- Molar mass: 317.429 g·mol^{−1}
- 3D model (JSmol): Interactive image
- SMILES: C1CN(C)CCC1OC(=O)C(O)(C3CCCC3)c2ccccc2
- InChI: InChI=1S/C19H27NO3/c1-20-13-11-17(12-14-20)23-18(21)19(22,16-9-5-6-10-16)15-7-3-2-4-8-15/h2-4,7-8,16-17,22H,5-6,9-14H2,1H3; Key:DZFJGXMHIMAYMW-UHFFFAOYSA-N

EA-3443 is a potent and long lasting anticholinergic deliriant drug, related to the chemical warfare agent 3-Quinuclidinyl benzilate (QNB). It was developed under contract to Edgewood Arsenal during the 1960s as part of the US military chemical weapons program, during research to improve upon the properties of earlier agents such as QNB.

The main advantages of EA-3443 were not only increased potency over QNB, but also a significantly improved central to peripheral effects ratio. Anticholinergic drugs produce both incapacitating deliriant effects through action in the brain, and a variety of distinctive physical symptoms such as dry mouth, dilated pupils, blurred vision and hot flushed skin, all of which together comprise the "anticholinergic syndrome" which is generally easy for doctors to diagnose. EA-3443 however is mainly selective for the brain, and when administered in a narrow dose range of around 0.3 mg can produce the central effects of confusion, hallucinations and amnesia, but without producing significant physical symptoms, which was predicted to make poisoning with EA-3443 much more difficult to diagnose and treat. However, despite these advantages, EA-3443 was never researched to the same extent as QNB or manufactured in bulk, and research into EA-3443 was discontinued along with the rest of the US chemical weapons program in the mid-1970s.

== See also ==
- EA-3167
- N-methyl-3-piperidyl benzilate
- N-ethyl-3-piperidyl benzilate
- 3-Quinuclidinyl benzilate
- Ditran
