= Edgewood Chemical Biological Center =

U.S. Army research facility

DEVCOM Chemical Biological Center
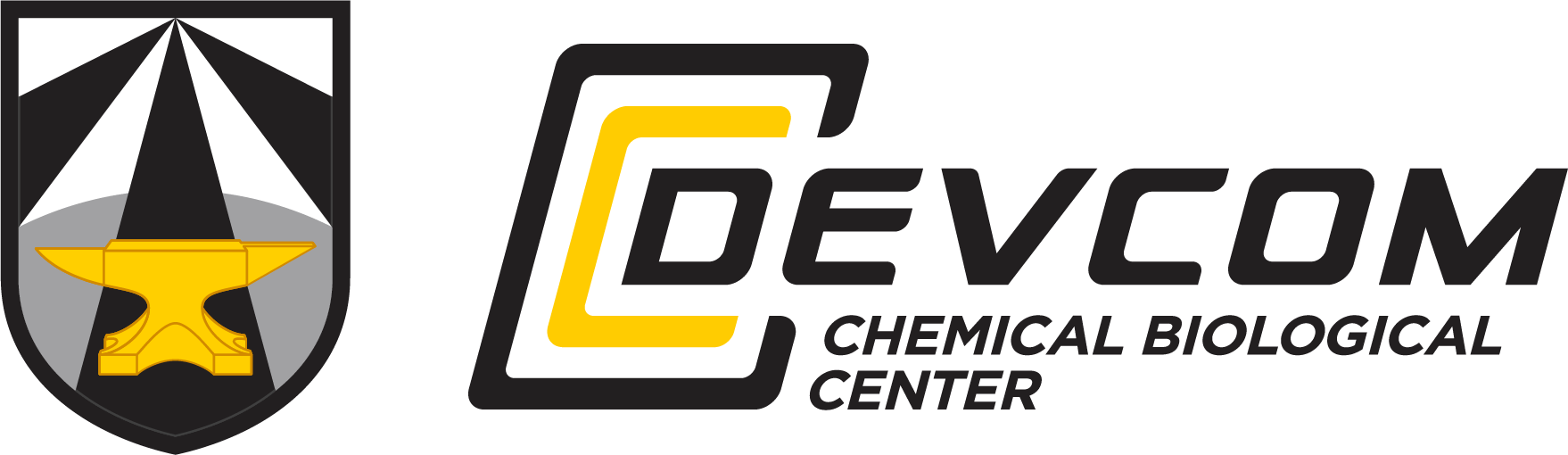
- Active: Unknown–present
- Country: United States
- Branch: U.S. Army
- Type: Research and development
- Part of: U.S. Army Combat Capabilities Development Command
- Garrison/HQ: Aberdeen Proving Ground, Maryland
- Motto: "Technology Driven. Warfighter focused."
- Website: cbc.devcom.army.mil

Commanders
- Director: Michael Bailey

The U.S. Army Combat Capabilities Development Command Chemical Biological Center (DEVCOM CBC) is the primary research and development resource inside the Department of Defense for non-medical chemical and biological defense. As a major organization in the CB defense community, the CBC supports all phases of the acquisition life-cycle ― from basic and applied research through technology development, engineering design, equipment evaluation, product support, sustainment, field operations, and demilitarization ― to address its customers’ requirements.

The center's mission is to provide innovative chemical, biological, radiological, nuclear, and explosive (CBRNE) defense capabilities to enable the joint warfighters' superiority on the battlefield, and interagency defense of the United States.

== History ==
As an organizational grandchild of the original Edgewood Arsenal, DEVCOM CBC traces its lineage back over a century to 1917, when President Woodrow Wilson established the site to be the location of the first chemical shell filling plant in the United States. Since that time, the center has expanded its mission to include biological materials.

=== Designations ===
DEVCOM CBC's name has changed many times over the past century. The name changes were:

- 1918 – Originally designated the Edgewood Arsenal by the War Department
- 1942 – Renamed to Chemical Warfare Center at Edgewood Arsenal
- 1946 – Renamed to Army Chemical Center at Edgewood Arsenal, concurrently with the formation of the Army Chemical Corps
- 1963 – Name returns to Edgewood Arsenal (both command and installation)
- 1977 – Edgewood Arsenal (command) was disestablished, and the Chemical Systems Laboratory (CSL) was established under the newly formed Armament Research and Development Command (ARRADCOM)
- 1983 – CSL redesignated as Chemical Research and Development Center (CRDC), under the new Armament, Munitions and Chemical Command (AMCCOM)
- 1986 – CRDC redesignated as Chemical Research, Development and Engineering Center (CRDEC)
- 1992 – CRDEC reorganized, forming the Edgewood Research, Development and Engineering Center (ERDEC), under the Chemical and Biological Defense Agency (CBDA)
- 1998 – ERDEC redesignated as Edgewood Chemical Biological Center (ECBC), under newly formed Soldier and Biological Chemical Command (SBCCOM)
- 2019 – ECBC redesignated as CCDC Chemical Biological Center, a part of the newly designated Combat Capabilities Development Command
- 2021 – Renamed to DEVCOM Chemical Biological Center

== Facilities and operations ==
The DEVCOM Chemical Biological Center has 1,300 full-time employees, located at four different sites in the United States: the Edgewood Area of Aberdeen Proving Ground, Maryland; Pine Bluff Arsenal, Arkansas; Rock Island Arsenal, Illinois; and Dugway Proving Ground, Utah. Between its four research campuses, DEVCOM CBC has 1.22 million square feet of laboratory and test chamber space.

DEVCOM CBC works with industry to collaborate on applied research, product development, and testing. DEVCOM CBC offers its partner companies the benefits of its intellectual property portfolio, science and engineering expertise, and its specialty chemical biological research and testing infrastructure. Mechanisms for collaborative research, development, and commercial production include: cooperative research and development agreements (CRADAs), letters of intent (LOIs), material transfer agreements (MTAs), patent license agreements (PLAs), technology support agreements (TSAs), plus memos of agreement and memos of understanding (MOAs and MOUs).

DEVCOM also possesses a chemical munitions field operations capability. It consists of field-deployable scientists, engineers, technicians, and explosives specialists with chemical/biological agent surety expertise plus unique capabilities for on-site destruction of agents. Finally, DEVCOM CBC develops smoke and obscurants technology, including its synthesis, transport, and dispersion.

== See also ==
- Edgewood Arsenal human experiments
- Edgewood Chemical Activity

== Sources ==
This article incorporates text from a free content work. Text taken from DEVCOM Chemical Biological Center: Facilities, U.S. Army Combat Capabilities Development Command.
