= 1-Benzyl-4-piperidone =

Names
- IUPAC name 1-benzylpiperidin-4-one

Identifiers
CAS Number	3612-20-2
3D model (JSmol)	Interactive image
ChEMBL	ChEMBL491630
ChemSpider	18137
ECHA InfoCard	100.020.712
EC Number	222-782-4
PubChem CID	19220
UNII	399249PH5B
CompTox Dashboard (EPA)	DTXSID30189695
- InChI: InChI=1S/C12H15NO/c14-12-6-8-13(9-7-12)10-11-4-2-1-3-5-11/h1-5H,6-10H2 Key: SJZKULRDWHPHGG-UHFFFAOYSA-N
- SMILES: C1CN(CCC1=O)CC2=CC=CC=C2

Properties
Chemical formula	C_{12}H_{15}NO
Molar mass	189.258 g·mol^{−1}
Solubility in water	12 g/L (20 °C)
- Except where otherwise noted, data are given for materials in their standard state (at 25 °C [77 °F], 100 kPa). Infobox references

1-Benzyl-4-piperidone, also called N-benzyl-4-piperidone, is a derivative of 4-piperidone.

== Physical properties ==
1-Benzyl-4-piperidone is normally in liquid state with a yellow color. It also has a strong odor. Additionally, 1-benzyl-4-piperidone has a solubility of 12 g/L in water at room temperature.

== Pharmaceutical chemistry usage ==
Like the related compound 4-piperidone, 1-benzyl-4-piperidone can be used in the synthesis of fentanyl. While using 1-benzyl-4-piperidone as the starting precursor initially yields benzylfentanyl (which is considered as virtually inactive), the resulting compound can be converted to fentanyl, according to Paul Jassen's works.

=== Regulations ===
As other drug precursors, 1-benzyl-4-piperidone is heavily regulated like its parent chemical. It is for example a compound on the DEA list and a Class A precursor under Canada's CDSA law.
