= Psychochemical warfare =

Warfare involving the usage of psychopharmacological agents

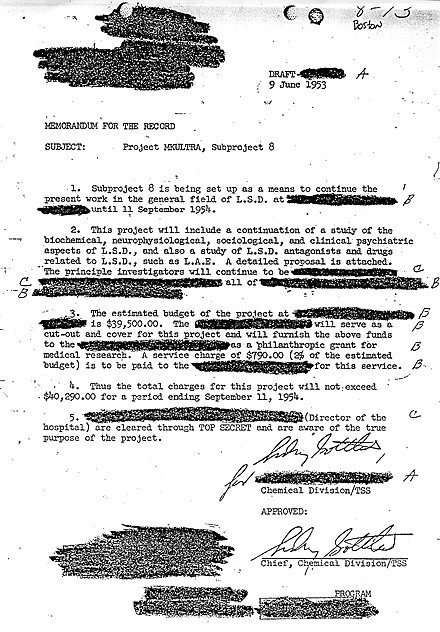
Project MKULTRA subproject 8 on the use of LSD as a psychochemical weapon

Psychochemical warfare involves the use of psychopharmacological agents (mind-altering drugs or chemicals) with the intention of incapacitating an adversary through the temporary induction of hallucinations or delirium. These agents, often called "drug weapons", are generally considered chemical weapons and, more narrowly, constitute a specific type of incapacitating agent.

Although never developed into an effective weapons system, psychochemical warfare theory and research—along with overlapping mind control drug research—was secretly pursued in the mid-20th century by the US military and Central Intelligence Agency (CIA) in the context of the Cold War. These research programs were ended when they came to light and generated controversy in the 1970s. The degree to which the Soviet Union developed or deployed similar agents during the same period remains largely unknown.

== History ==
=== Ancient psycho-chemical use ===
The use of chemicals to induce altered states of mind dates back to antiquity and includes the use of plants such as thornapple (Datura stramonium) that contain combinations of anticholinergic alkaloids. In 184 B.C., Hannibal's army used belladonna plants to induce disorientation.

=== Use by indigenous peoples ===
Records indicate that in 1611, in the British Jamestown Colony of Virginia, an unidentified, but toxic and hallucinogenic, drug derived from local plants was deployed with some success against the white settlers by Chief Powhatan.

In 1881, members of a French railway surveying expedition crossing Tuareg territory in North Africa ate dried dates that tribesmen had apparently deliberately contaminated with Egyptian henbane (Hyoscyamus muticus, or H. falezlez), to devastating effect.

=== Modern military research ===
In the 1950s, the CIA investigated LSD (lysergic acid diethylamide) as part of its Project MKUltra. In the same period, the US Army undertook the secret Edgewood Arsenal human experiments which grew out of the U.S. chemical warfare program and involved studies of several hundred volunteer test subjects. Britain was also investigating the possible use of LSD and the chemical BZ (3-quinuclidinyl benzilate) as nonlethal battlefield drug-weapons. The United States eventually weaponized BZ for delivery in the M43 BZ cluster bomb until stocks were destroyed in 1989. Both the US and Britain concluded that the desired effects of drug weapons were unpredictable under battlefield conditions and gave up experimentation.

Reports of drug weapons associated with the Soviet bloc have been considered unreliable given the apparent absence of documentation in state archives.

== See also ==
- Biological weapon
- Chemical warfare
- Chemical weapon
- "Gay bomb"
- List of drugs used by militaries
- List of chemical warfare agents
- List of highly toxic gases
- The Dark Pictures Anthology: Man of Medan
