= Benzilic acid =

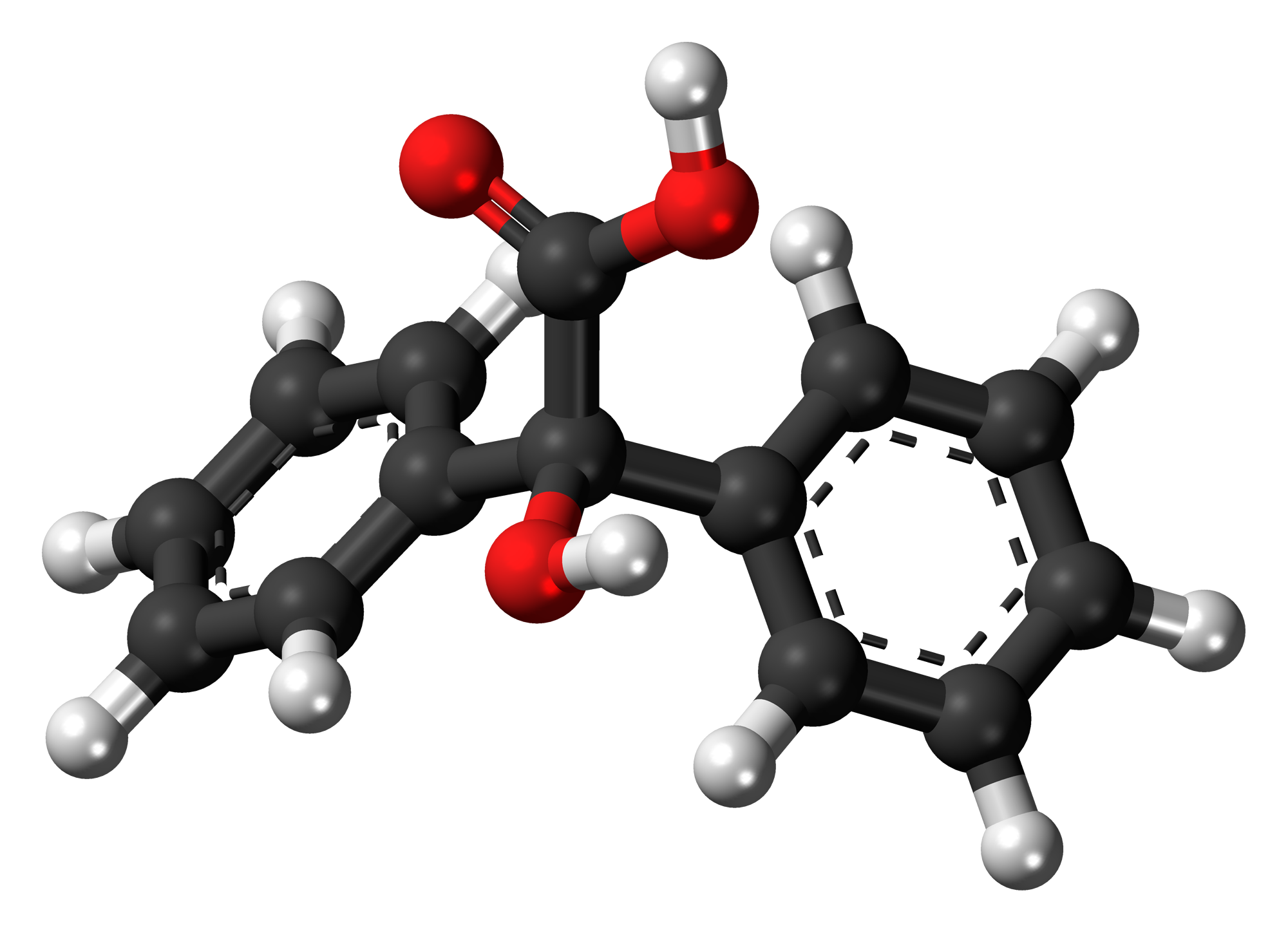

Names
- Preferred IUPAC name Hydroxydi(phenyl)acetic acid
- Other names α,α-Diphenyl-α-hydroxyacetic acid, α,α-Diphenylglycolic acid, α-Hydroxydiphenyl acetic acid, 2,2-Diphenyl-2-hydroxyacetic acid, 2-Hydroxy-2,2-diphenylacetic acid, Diphenyl glycolic acid, Hydroxydiphenyl acetic acid

Identifiers
CAS Number	76-93-7
3D model (JSmol)	Interactive image
Beilstein Reference	521402
ChEBI	CHEBI:39414
ChEMBL	ChEMBL578171
ChemSpider	6220
ECHA InfoCard	100.000.904
EC Number	200-993-2
Gmelin Reference	281752
PubChem CID	6463
UNII	8F6J993XXR
CompTox Dashboard (EPA)	DTXSID0058805
- InChI: InChI=1S/C14H12O3/c15-13(16)14(17,11-7-3-1-4-8-11)12-9-5-2-6-10-12/h1-10,17H,(H,15,16) Key: UKXSKSHDVLQNKG-UHFFFAOYSA-N; InChI=1/C14H12O3/c15-13(16)14(17,11-7-3-1-4-8-11)12-9-5-2-6-10-12/h1-10,17H,(H,15,16) Key: UKXSKSHDVLQNKG-UHFFFAOYAV
- SMILES: O=C(O)C(O)(c1ccccc1)c2ccccc2

Properties
Chemical formula	C_{14}H_{12}O_{3}
Molar mass	228.247 g·mol^{−1}
Appearance	white solid
Density	1.08 g/cm^{3}
Melting point	150 to 152 °C (302 to 306 °F; 423 to 425 K)
Boiling point	180 °C (356 °F; 453 K) (17.3 hPa)
Solubility in water	2 g/L (20 °C)

Hazards
- GHS labelling
Pictograms	(GHS07: Exclamation mark)
Signal word	Warning
Hazard statements	H302
Precautionary statements	P264, P270, P301+P312, P330, P501
NFPA 704 (fire diamond)	2 1 0
- Except where otherwise noted, data are given for materials in their standard state (at 25 °C [77 °F], 100 kPa). verify (what is ?) Infobox references

Benzilic acid is an organic compound with formula C_{14}H_{12}O_{3} or (C_{6}H_{5})_{2}(HO)C(COOH). It is a white crystalline aromatic acid, soluble in many primary alcohols.

== Preparation ==
Benzilic acid can be prepared by heating a mixture of benzil, ethanol, and potassium hydroxide.

Another preparation, performed by Liebig in 1838, is the dimerization of benzaldehyde, to benzil, which is transformed to the product by the benzilic acid rearrangement reaction.

== Uses ==
Benzilic acid is used in the manufacture of glycollate pharmaceuticals including clidinium, dilantin, flutropium, and mepenzolate which are antagonists of the muscarinic acetylcholine receptors.

It is used in manufacture of the incapacitating agent 3-quinuclidinyl benzilate (BZ) which is regulated by the Chemical Weapons Convention. It is also monitored by law enforcement agencies of many countries, because of its use in the manufacture in hallucinogenic drugs.

Benzilic acid can be reduced with hydroiodic acid to give diphenylacetic acid [117-34-0].
