= Danitracen =

Tetracyclic antidepressant

Identifiers
- IUPAC name: 4-(6H-benzo[c][1]benzothiepin-11-ylidene)-1-methylpiperidine
- CAS Number: 1447-70-7
- PubChem CID: 35758
- ChemSpider: 32893
- UNII: SD507F5T2W
- ChEMBL: ChEMBL440557
- CompTox Dashboard (EPA): DTXSID70185156

Chemical and physical data
- Formula: C_{20}H_{21}NO
- Molar mass: 291.394 g·mol^{−1}
- 3D model (JSmol): Interactive image
- SMILES: CN1CCC(=C2C3=CC=CC=C3C(C4=CC=CC=C42)O)CC1
- InChI: InChI=1S/C20H21NO/c1-21-12-10-14(11-13-21)19-15-6-2-4-8-17(15)20(22)18-9-5-3-7-16(18)19/h2-9,20,22H,10-13H2,1H3; Key:HLBRHTFSMMEHPK-UHFFFAOYSA-N

Danitracen (WA 335) is an antidepressant compound developed in the 1970s. Danitracen acts by blocking central and peripheral 5-HT receptors: it potentiates testosterone-induced sexual behavior in rats and abolishes the 5-hydroxytryptophan (5-HTP) induced hypermotility in mice. In amphetamine-treated rats, administration of danitracen lowered whole brain serotonin and norepinephrine levels. Danitracen was investigated in clinical trials in depressed patients. At 3 mg/day, danitracen was equipotent to 150 mg/day amitriptyline.

== See also ==
- Cyproheptadine
- Pimethixene
