= AC-90179 =

Chemical compound

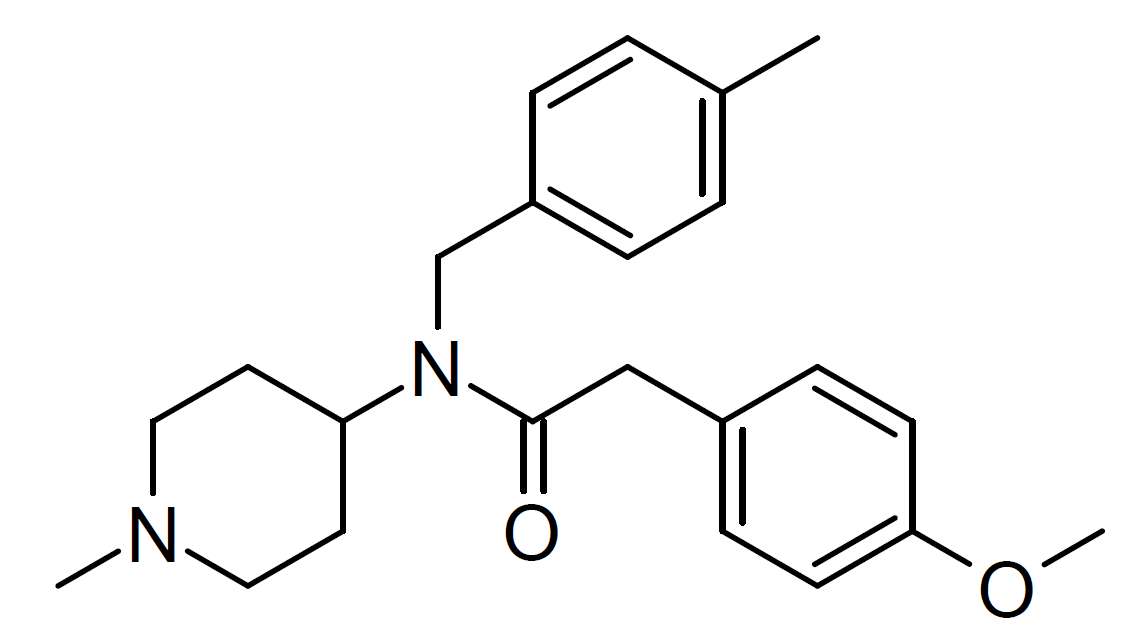

Identifiers
- IUPAC name: 2-(4-methoxyphenyl)-N-[(4-methylphenyl)methyl]-N-(1-methylpiperidin-4-yl)acetamide
- CAS Number: 359878-17-4
- PubChem CID: 9799308
- ChemSpider: 7975073
- UNII: H0EVX3PS4B

Chemical and physical data
- Formula: C_{23}H_{30}N_{2}O_{2}
- Molar mass: 366.505 g·mol^{−1}
- 3D model (JSmol): Interactive image
- SMILES: CC1=CC=C(C=C1)CN(C2CCN(CC2)C)C(=O)CC3=CC=C(C=C3)OC
- InChI: InChI=1S/C23H30N2O2/c1-18-4-6-20(7-5-18)17-25(21-12-14-24(2)15-13-21)23(26)16-19-8-10-22(27-3)11-9-19/h4-11,21H,12-17H2,1-3H3; Key:AHGNJBSTWQOSAB-UHFFFAOYSA-N

AC-90179 is a piperidine derivative which acts as an inverse agonist at the 5-HT_{2A} serotonin receptor and an antagonist at 5-HT_{2C}. It was developed as a potential antipsychotic but was not pursued for medical applications due to poor oral bioavailability; however, it continues to be used as a tool compound in pharmacological research.

== See also ==
- Serotonin 5-HT_{2A} receptor antagonist
- Pimavanserin
- Volinanserin
