= 4-Piperidone =

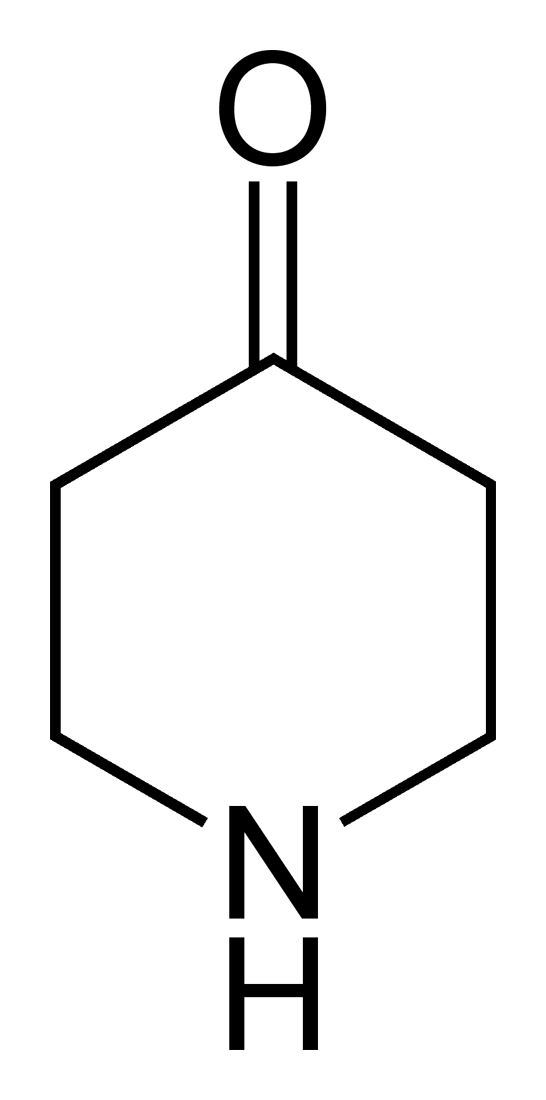

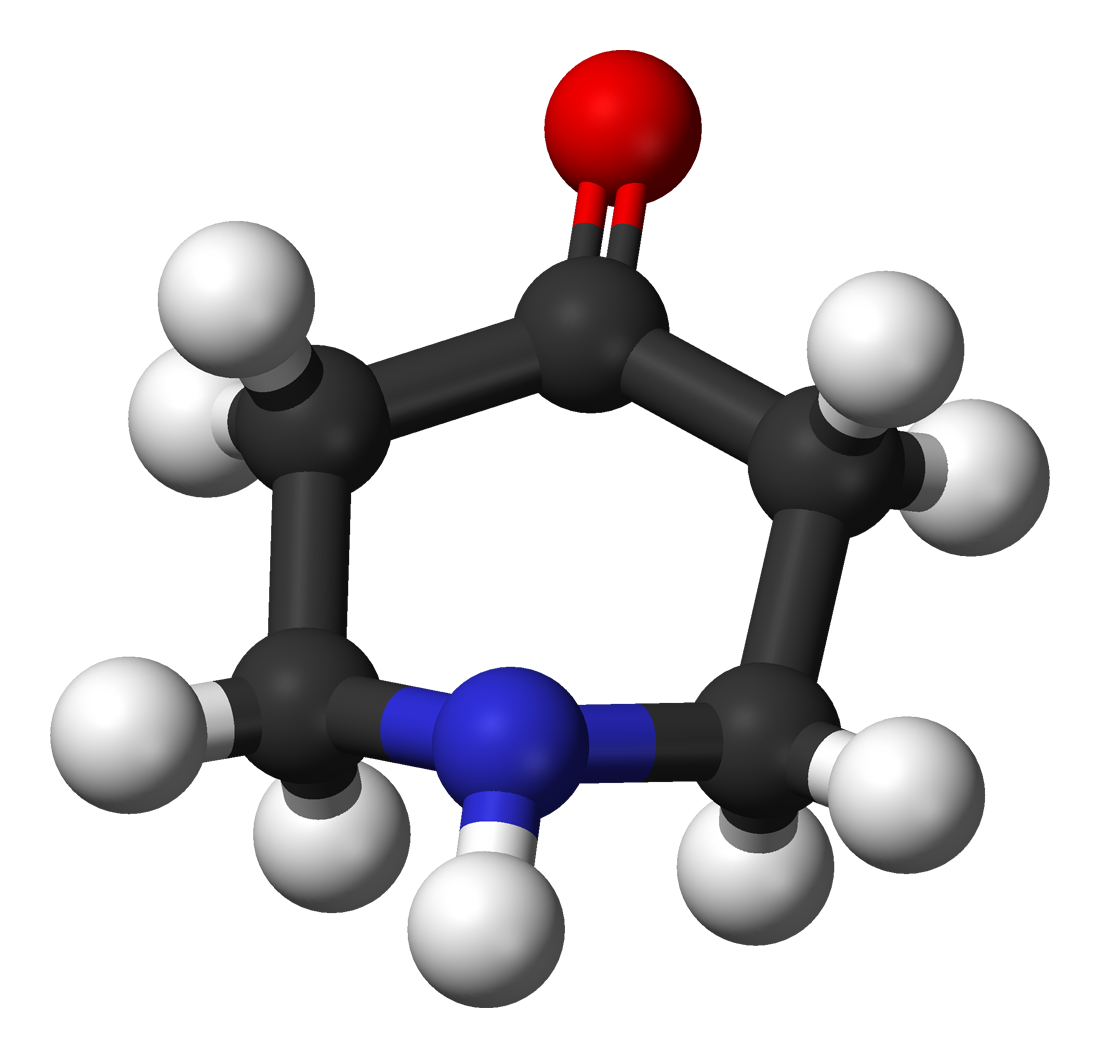

Names
- Preferred IUPAC name Piperidin-4-one
- Other names 4-Piperidone; Azinanone; Azinan-4-one

Identifiers
CAS Number	41661-47-6
3D model (JSmol)	Interactive image
ChemSpider	31091
ECHA InfoCard	100.050.420
EC Number	255-481-1
PubChem CID	33721
UNII	15WP1EA7UH
CompTox Dashboard (EPA)	DTXSID50194488
- InChI: InChI=1S/C5H9NO/c7-5-1-3-6-4-2-5/h6H,1-4H2 Key: VRJHQPZVIGNGMX-UHFFFAOYSA-N; InChI=1/C5H9NO/c7-5-1-3-6-4-2-5/h6H,1-4H2 Key: VRJHQPZVIGNGMX-UHFFFAOYAC
- SMILES: O=C1CCNCC1

Properties
Chemical formula	C_{5}H_{9}NO
Molar mass	99.133 g·mol^{−1}
Boiling point	79 °C (174 °F; 352 K)

Hazards
- GHS labelling
Pictograms	(GHS07: Exclamation mark)
Signal word	Warning
Hazard statements	H315, H319, H335
Precautionary statements	P261, P264, P271, P280, P302+P352, P304+P340, P305+P351+P338, P312, P321, P332+P313, P337+P313, P362, P403+P233, P405, P501
NFPA 704 (fire diamond)	1 3
Flash point	91 °C (196 °F; 364 K)

Related compounds
Related compounds	Piperidine; 2-Piperidinone
- Except where otherwise noted, data are given for materials in their standard state (at 25 °C [77 °F], 100 kPa). verify (what is ?) Infobox references

4-Piperidone is an organic compound with the molecular formula OC(CH_{2})_{4}NH. It can be viewed as a derivative of piperidine. 4-Piperidone is used as an intermediate in the manufacture of chemicals and pharmaceutical drugs. Substituted and dehydro derivatives of 4-piperidinone are intermediates in alkaloid syntheses.

The N-protonated derivative is typically isolated as the hydrate (HO)_{2}C(CH_{2})_{4}NH^{+}_{2}.

It is a List I chemical in the United States as it is a precursor to fentanyl.

It is also used in the synthesis of NLX-204 and F-15,599.

== See also ==
- 4-Pyridone
- 1-Methyl-4-piperidone
