= CS-27349 =

Chemical compound

Identifiers
- IUPAC name: (1R,2R,5S)-8-Methyl-8-azabicyclo[3.2.1]oct-2-yl hydroxy(diphenyl)acetate
- CAS Number: 64471-12-1; HCl: 64520-33-8
- PubChem CID: 3049185; HCl: 3049184
- ChemSpider: 143123; HCl: 57264798
- UNII: RD1A447UC0
- ChEMBL: ChEMBL298138
- CompTox Dashboard (EPA): DTXSID70983033; HCl: DTXSID90983151

Chemical and physical data
- Formula: C_{22}H_{25}NO_{3}
- Molar mass: 351.446 g·mol^{−1}
- 3D model (JSmol): Interactive image
- SMILES: CN1C2CC[C@H](C1CC2)OC(=O)C(C3=CC=CC=C3)(C4=CC=CC=C4)O.Cl
- InChI: InChI=1S/C22H25NO3/c1-23-18-12-14-19(23)20(15-13-18)26-21(24)22(25,16-8-4-2-5-9-16)17-10-6-3-7-11-17/h2-11,18-20,25H,12-15H2,1H3/t18?,19?,20-/m1/s1; Key:LSJGAYNIIMEDLR-SOAGJPPSSA-N

CS-27349, or L-2-α-tropinyl benzilate, is an experimental incapacitating agent. It acts as an antagonist to muscarinic acetylcholine receptors, causing delirium. It has 37% of the potency of the related compound 3-quinuclidinyl benzilate (BZ) in producing peripheral effects, but 85% of the potency in producing central effects. The mean dose required to incapacitate subjects was 1.2 times that of BZ. It has not been in use since the 1970s, and there have been no publications about its effects or long-term toxicology since then.

Reference: Patent:

It is interesting to notice that 2-tropinone is made from cocaine alkaloid. On a related note, it is worthy of mention that 2-tropinone has also had use in the synthesis of isohomoepibatidine and isohomoepiboxidine. These are neonicotinoids that were explored as alternatives to epibatidine, which was too toxic for clinical use.
