= Swords to Plowshares =

US nonprofit organization serving military veterans based in the San Francisco Bay Area

- Type: Veterans Rights Organization
- Location(s): 1060 Howard Street San Francisco, California 330 Franklin Street Oakland, California

Swords to Plowshares is a veterans service organization that provides job training, housing, and benefits advocacy to low income and homeless U.S. military veterans. Since 1974, Swords to Plowshares has advocated on behalf of all veterans, providing services that are informed by the experiences of their clients. The agency operates two service centers for veterans to access resources and begin their path to housing, self-sufficiency, and/or healthcare. Swords to Plowshares also advocates for the rights and wellbeing of veterans at the federal, state, and local levels. It is a 501(c)(3) non-profit organization headquartered in San Francisco, supported by governmental and private grants, as well as donations from individuals. Tramecia Garner is the executive director.

== Mission statement ==
War causes wounds and suffering that last beyond the battlefield. Swords to Plowshares' mission is to support veterans as they navigate the challenges of post-military life, and to prevent and end veteran homelessness through wrap-around care and informed advocacy.

== History ==
=== 1970s ===
Swords to Plowshares was founded in 1974 by six veterans who had been assigned as VISTA volunteers to work in Bay Area Veterans Administration (VA) facilities. They became concerned that the VA was not properly addressing the needs of returning Vietnam veterans. Within four years, Swords to Plowshares became the first organization certified by the Veterans Administration to represent U.S. military veterans seeking compensation.

The organization began to raise awareness of, and advocate for, veterans suffering from Post Traumatic Stress Disorder PTSD and exposure to Agent Orange during the Vietnam War, resulting in Swords to Plowshares accepting a federal grant for veteran service agencies representing veterans who suffered health disorders as a consequence of Agent Orange exposure.

=== 1980s ===
Recognizing the over-representation of veterans among San Francisco's homeless population, Swords to Plowshares began to offer a transitional housing program in 1988. This program became a model for transitional housing nationally. During the same period of skyrocketing homelessness, Swords to Plowshares also began offering emergency housing, mental health treatment, and social service referrals through its "drop-in" center in downtown San Francisco.

=== 1990s to present ===
Swords to Plowshares continued to expand its veteran housing programs from 1998 to 2000 with the lease of a series of decommissioned military barracks in the San Francisco Presidio, which was termed "The Veterans Academy". This permanent supportive housing facility currently serves more than 100 veterans, offering a variety of vocational training and residential programs.

=== Legal cases ===
The Edgewood Arsenal case, VVA, et al. v. CIA, DOD, et al., is a class action lawsuit filed by Swords to Plowshares and Vietnam Veterans of California on behalf of veterans who were exposed to toxins, biological and nerve agents, and mind-altering drugs during military experiments that began in the 1950s. The late Gordon Erspamer, senior litigation counsel in the San Francisco office of Morrison & Foerster, which is representing Swords to Plowshares and Vietnam Veterans of California's clients, alleged that US soldiers were, at the Edgewood facility northeast of Baltimore, Maryland, secretly subject to a series of CIA mind-control experiments related to those known as MKUltra. The veterans "volunteered" for human experimentation programs but weren't informed of the nature of the experiments, weren't given the awards they were promised, and weren't properly cared for afterward. The plaintiffs demand details of the experiments, the awards and follow-up health care they deserve; and for the government to supply details to the VA to support claims for their service-connected disabilities.

== Programs and services ==
=== Service centers ===
The Service centers in San Francisco and Oakland welcome Bay Area veterans of all backgrounds, service eras, discharge status, and identities. Staff provide critical care to veterans in crisis and process clients to assess their needs and link them to appropriate programs, resources, and assistance within the agency.

=== Supportive housing ===
Swords to Plowshares operates multiple permanent supportive housing sites in San Francisco, currently offering 500 units for veterans living with disabilities and have histories of homelessness. The organization also offers low-barrier transitional housing, emergency housing, and rental support for veterans.

=== Legal services ===
Swords to Plowshares is accredited by the Department of Veterans Affairs as a qualified representative for veterans for VA benefits claims and appeals. The Legal Department assists and represents clients with service-connected disability compensation, non-service-connected pension, character of discharge applications for basic veteran eligibility, medical care entitlement, rating increases, and overpayment issues. It also provides assistance with discharge upgrade applications and requests for corrections to military records.

=== Employment and training services ===
The Employment and Training staff work one-on-one with veterans to overcome barriers to employment, access job training, and connect with local employers.

=== Supportive Services for Veteran Families ===
Supportive Services for Veteran Families is a VA-funded program that provides critical services and short-term financial support with move-in assistance, eviction prevention, housing location assistance, and a host of ancillary services. This program serves both individual veterans and veterans with families.
