= Enpiperate =

Names
- Preferred IUPAC name 1-Methylpiperidin-4-yl hydroxydi(phenyl)acetate

Identifiers
CAS Number	3608-67-1
3D model (JSmol)	Interactive image
ChemSpider	69594
ECHA InfoCard	100.020.704
IUPHAR/BPS	352
PubChem CID	77157
UNII	QWK86805EB
CompTox Dashboard (EPA)	DTXSID20189664
- InChI: InChI=1S/C20H23NO3/c1-21-14-12-18(13-15-21)24-19(22)20(23,16-8-4-2-5-9-16)17-10-6-3-7-11-17/h2-11,18,23H,12-15H2,1H3 Key: UGYPGJCVNPPUPE-UHFFFAOYSA-N; InChI=1/C20H23NO3/c1-21-14-12-18(13-15-21)24-19(22)20(23,16-8-4-2-5-9-16)17-10-6-3-7-11-17/h2-11,18,23H,12-15H2,1H3 Key: UGYPGJCVNPPUPE-UHFFFAOYAQ
- SMILES: CN1CCC(CC1)OC(=O)C(C2=CC=CC=C2)(C3=CC=CC=C3)O

Properties
Chemical formula	C_{20}H_{23}NO_{3}
Molar mass	325.408 g·mol^{−1}
- Except where otherwise noted, data are given for materials in their standard state (at 25 °C [77 °F], 100 kPa). verify (what is ?) Infobox references

Enpiperate is a calcium channel blocker.
