= Edgewood Arsenal human experiments =

US military chemical warfare research

"Effects of Lysergic Acid Diethylamide (LSD) on Troops Marching" – 16mm film produced by the United States military c. 1958

From 1955 to 1975, the U.S. Army Chemical Corps conducted classified human subject research at the Edgewood Arsenal facility in Maryland. These experiments began after the conclusion of World War II, and continued until the public became aware of the experiments, resulting in significant outcry. The purpose was to evaluate the impact of low-dose chemical warfare agents on military personnel and to test protective clothing, pharmaceuticals, and vaccines. A small portion of these studies were directed at psychochemical warfare; grouped under the title "Medical Research Volunteer Program" (1956–1975), driven by intelligence requirements and the need for new and more effective interrogation techniques.

Overall, about 6,720 soldiers took part in these experiments that involved exposures to more than 250 different chemicals, according to the Department of Defense (DoD). Some of the volunteers exhibited symptoms at the time of exposure to these agents, but long-term follow-up was not planned as part of the DoD studies. The experiments were abruptly terminated by the Army in late 1975 amidst an atmosphere of scandal and recrimination, as lawmakers accused researchers of questionable ethics. Many official government reports and civilian lawsuits followed in the wake of the controversy.

The chemical agents tested on volunteers included chemical warfare agents and other related agents:

- Anticholinesterase nerve agents (VX, sarin) and common organophosphorus (OP) and carbamate pesticides
- Mustard agents
- Nerve agent antidotes including atropine and scopolamine
- Nerve agent reactivators, e.g. the common OP antidote 2-PAM chloride
- Psychoactive agents including LSD, PCP, cannabinoids, and BZ
- Irritants and riot control agents
- Alcohol and caffeine

== History ==
=== Background and rationale ===
After the conclusion of World War II, U.S. military researchers obtained formulas for the three nerve gases developed by the Nazis—tabun, soman, and sarin.

In 1947, the first steps of planning began when Dr. Alsoph H. Corwin, a professor of chemistry at Johns Hopkins University wrote the Chemical Corps Technical Command positing the potential for the use of specialized enzymes as so-called "toxicological warfare agents". He went on to suggest that, with intensive research, substances that depleted certain necessary nutrients could be found, which would, when administered on the battlefield, incapacitate enemy combatants.

In 1948, the U.S. Army's Edgewood Chemical Biological Center began conducting research using the aforementioned nerve gases. These studies included a classified human subjects component at least as early as 1948, when "psychological reactions" were documented in Edgewood technicians. Initially, such studies focused solely on the lethality of the gases and its treatment and prevention.

A classified report entitled "Psychochemical Warfare: A New Concept of War" was produced in 1949 by Luther Wilson Greene, Technical Director of the Chemical and Radiological Laboratories at Edgewood. Greene called for a search for novel psychoactive compounds that would create the same debilitating mental side effects as those produced by nerve gases, but without their lethal effect. In his words,

Throughout recorded history, wars have been characterized by death, human misery, and the destruction of property; each major conflict being more catastrophic than the one preceding it ... I am convinced that it is possible, by means of the techniques of psychochemical warfare, to conquer an enemy without the wholesale killing of his people or the mass destruction of his property.

In the late 1940s and early 1950s, the U.S. Army worked with Harvard anesthesiologist Henry K. Beecher at its interrogation center at Camp King in Germany on the use of psychoactive compounds (mescaline, LSD), including human subject experiments and the debriefing of former Nazi physicians and scientists who had worked along similar lines before the end of the war. In the 1950s, some officials in the U.S. Department of Defense publicly asserted that many "forms of chemical and allied warfare as more 'humane' than existing weapons. For example, certain types of 'psychochemicals' would make it possible to paralyze temporarily entire population centers without damage to homes and other structures." Soviet advances in the same field were cited as a special incentive giving impetus to research efforts in this area, according to testimony by Maj. Gen. Marshall Stubbs, the Army's chief chemical officer.

In June 1955, the United States Department of Defense appointed a so-called Ad Hoc Study Group on Psychochemical Agents, which seems to have acted as a central authority on the research of psychochemical at Edgewood Arsenal and other installations where such experimentation occurred.

General William M. Creasy, former chief chemical officer, U.S. Army, testified to the U.S. House of Representatives in 1959 that "provided sufficient emphasis is put behind it, I think the future lies in the psychochemicals." This was alarming enough to a Harvard psychiatrist, E. James Lieberman, that he published an article entitled "Psychochemicals as Weapons" in The Bulletin of the Atomic Scientists in 1962. Lieberman, while acknowledging that "most of the military data" on the research ongoing at the Army Chemical Center was "secret and unpublished", asserted that "There are moral imponderables, such as whether insanity, temporary or permanent, is a more 'humane' military threat than the usual afflictions of war."

== The experiments ==
The Edgewood Arsenal human experiments took place from approximately 1948 to 1975 at the Medical Research Laboratories—which is now known as the U.S. Army Medical Research Institute of Chemical Defense (USAMRICD)—at the Edgewood Area, Aberdeen Proving Ground, Maryland. The experiments involved at least 254 chemical substances, but focused mainly on midspectrum incapacitants, such as LSD, THC derivatives, benzodiazepines, and BZ. Around 7,000 U.S. military personnel and 1,000 civilians were test subjects over almost three decades. A result of these experiments was that BZ was weaponized, although never deployed.

According to a DoD FAQ, the Edgewood Arsenal experiments involved the following "rough breakout of volunteer hours against various experimental categories":

Experimental category	Percentage of volunteer hours
Incapacitating compounds	29.9%
Lethal compounds	14.5%
Riot control compounds	14.2%
Protective equipment and clothing	13.2%
Development evaluation and test procedures	12.5%
Effects of drugs and environmental stress on human physiological mechanisms	6.4%
Human factors tests (ability to follow instructions)	2.1%
Other (visual studies, sleep deprivation, etc.)	7.2%

=== Acetylcholine related experiments ===
Much of the experimentation at Edgewood Arsenal surrounded the modulation of acetylcholine or acetylcholinesterase, or the deactivation and reactivation of substances which did the same. These experiments represented a significant enough proportion of the total experimentation to earn a dedicated volume in the main experimental documentation. Much of the follow-up data on the acetylcholine-related experiments are lacking or entirely missing, due to a combination of remaining classification and failures on the part of the United States Department of Veterans Affairs and United States Department of Defense to follow the subjects of the experimentation.

==== Anticholinesterase experiments ====
Anticholinesterases are substances that interfere with the central nervous system and the peripheral nervous system by inhibiting acetylcholinesterase and therefore sustaining the effect of acetylcholine or butyrylcholine within the chemical synapses, resulting in a cholinergic crisis, and possibly death if untreated.

Long-term side effects of exposure to anticholinesterases, including at levels below the threshold for profound illness and death, can include paralysis and peripheral neuropathy, sleep disturbance, genetic mutation and cancer. In total, 1,406 subjects were tested with 16 agents, some of which included reactivating agents and protective agents.

==== Anticholinergic experiments ====
Anticholinergics are substances that interfere with the central nervous system and the peripheral nervous system by inhibiting acetylcholine, resulting in what is essentially the opposite effect of a cholinesterase inhibitor to the extreme. This can result in anticholinergic syndrome, and possibly death if untreated.

Available data from both experiment patients and pharmaceutical research indicates that short-term exposure to anticholinergic compounds, especially the extremely limited exposures described in the documentation, is associated with no long-term effects. In the decades since their introduction to medical use, research has begun to suggest a causal relationship between long-term anticholinergic drug use and later development or worsening of dementia. In total, 1,752 subjects were tested with 21 agents, some of whom received exposure to more than one chemical agent.

==== Cholinesterase reactivator experiments ====
Cholinesterase reactivators are substances which reactivate acetylcholinesterase which has been inactivated by an anticholinesterase. This action can be precipitated through a variety of mechanisms, including directly binding and deactivating the anticholinesterase itself, blocking the reaction between the anticholinesterase and the acetylcholinesterase, changing the release of acetylcholine, blocking acetylcholine's cholinolytic effect, or by increasing the excretion of the anticholinesterase.

Available data from the experiments and from prescribing information from modern marketing of these substances concludes that little risk exists of long-term effects from exposure. It is noted, however, in both the prescribing information for modern variants and in toxicological research on the subject that it has been the subject of insufficient research to conclude this beyond a reasonable doubt. In total, 219 subjects were tested with four agents.

=== Psychochemical related experiments ===
The 1976 report on the matter identifies the sole objective of the psychochemical experiments as determining the impact on morale and efficacy such agents would have on military units. It appears that these experiments specifically were first called for in 1954 after the attendees of the First Psychochemical Conference informed the Department of Defense that human trials were indicated. In 1957, the first report of such trials were received, detailing a four-person experiment wherein they attempted to successfully decontaminate themselves of a mock agent while under the influence of LSD.

==== LSD experiments ====
The LSD experiments are perhaps the best documented of the psychochemical experiments of the time, garnering at least two significant independent reports. LSD is a psychedelic drug that acts as a dopamine and serotonin agonist precipitating a hallucinogenic effect, leading to hallucinations, euphoria, and a wide variety of physiological symptoms.

Available data describes a wide range of doses used in the experiments, from approximately 2μg/kg to 16μg/kg A typical dose for recreational use is around 100μg, or about 1.1μg/kg for the average adult male in the U.S., meaning that the lowest dose used in experimentation was almost twice the typical recreational dose, and the highest dose exceeded fifteen times the typical recreational dose. Because of limited documentation, it is difficult to ascertain which experiments occurred at which installations, but available documentation describes several general types of experiments, which included presenting individuals with radar symbols for interpretation, having them track a simulated aircraft, having them read a map, having them interpret meteorological data, and having them attempt to defend an installation against a simulated hostile air craft attack with 40-mm antiaircraft automatic weapons. Results varied between experiments but typically showed significant impairment at all doses, with impairment increasing as dose did.

Available data from the experiments concluded that long-term effects from LSD exposure in not only the Edgewood Arsenal Experiments, but also in the other associated experiments conducted concurrently by the Army Chemical Corps were minimal, with the exception of a possible small increase in congenital heart disease in offspring of the experimental subjects, and neuropsychological abnormalities in 9% of the participants which could not be explained by etiological explanations other than LSD exposure, most of which were considered mild. It is reported that all testing of LSD at Edgewood Arsenal and in general on behalf of the Army Chemical Corps was abandoned on or around April 1963.

==== BZ experiments ====
3-Quinuclidinyl benzilate, or BZ, is a substance that interferes with the central nervous system and the peripheral nervous system by inhibiting acetylcholine. Existing documentation admits only that the substance was tested at Edgewood Arsenal, and all other data, including the medical records from the subjects are completely missing. Because of the extremely limited data, speculation on possible side effects from exposure is impossible.

=== Scandal and termination ===
In September 1975, the Medical Research Volunteer Program (MRVP) was discontinued and all resident volunteers were removed from the Edgewood installation. The founder and director of the program, Van Murray Sim, was called before Congress and chastised by outraged lawmakers, who questioned the absence of follow-up care for the human volunteers. An Army investigation subsequently found no evidence of serious injuries or deaths associated with the MRVP, but deplored both the recruiting process and the informed consent approach, which they characterized as "suggest[ing] possible coercion".

== Aftermath ==
=== Government reports ===
1982–85 IOM report
The Institute of Medicine (IOM) published a three-volume report on the Edgewood research in 1982–1985, Possible Long-Term Health Effects of Short-Term Exposure to Chemical Agents.

The three volumes were:

- Vol. 1, "Anticholinesterases and Anticholinergics" (1982).
- Vol. 2, "Cholinesterase Reactivators, Psychochemicals and Irritants and Vesicants" (1984)
- Vol. 3, "Final Report: Current Health Status of Test Subjects" (1985)

The National Academy of Sciences, which oversees the IOM, sent a questionnaire to all of the former volunteers that could be located, approximately 60% of the total. The lack of a detailed record hampered the investigation. The study could not rule out long-term health effects related to exposure to the nerve agents. It concluded that "Whether the subjects at Edgewood incurred these changes [depression, cognitive deficits, tendency to suicide] and to what extent they might now show these effects are not known". With regard specifically to BZ and related compounds, the IOM study concluded that "available data suggest that long-term toxic effects and/or delayed sequellae are unlikely".

2004 GAO report
A Government Accounting Office report of May 2004, Chemical and Biological Defense: DOD Needs to Continue to Collect and Provide Information on Tests and Potentially Exposed Personnel (pp. 1, 24), stated:

[In 1993 and 1994] we [...] reported that the Army Chemical Corps conducted a classified medical research program for developing incapacitating agents. This program involved testing nerve agents, nerve agent antidotes, psycho chemicals, and irritants. The chemicals were given to volunteer service members at Edgewood Arsenal, Maryland; Dugway Proving Ground, Utah; and Forts Benning, Bragg, and McClellan. In total, Army documents identified 7,120 Army and Air Force personnel who participated in these tests. Further, GAO concluded that precise information on the scope and the magnitude of tests involving human subjects was not available, and the exact number of human subjects might never be known.

=== Safety debates ===
The official position of the Department of Defense, based on the three-volume set of studies by the Institute of Medicine mentioned above, is that they "did not detect any significant long-term health effects on the Edgewood Arsenal volunteers". The safety record of the Edgewood Arsenal experiments was also defended in the memoirs of psychiatrist and retired colonel James Ketchum, a key scientist:

Over a period of 20 years, more than 7,000 volunteers spent an estimated total of 14,000 months at Edgewood Arsenal. To my knowledge, not one of them died or suffered a serious illness or permanent injury. That adds up to 1,167 man-years of survival. Statistically, at least one out of a thousand young soldiers chosen at random might be expected to expire during any one-year period. By this logic, Edgewood was possibly the safest military place in the world to spend two months.

As late as 2014, information was incomplete; IOM could not conduct adequate medical studies related to similar former U.S. biowarfare programs, because relevant classified documents had not been declassified and released.

The committee's understanding is that additional, and potentially relevant, material on SHAD tests exists and remains classified. The IOM committee requested declassification of 21 additional elements from at least nine documents from DoD in August 2012. In January 2014, an additional request was made for release of multiple films made of Project SHAD tests. None of the requested materials were cleared for public release as of this writing (2016).

Even a book critical of the program, written by Lynn C. Klotz and Edward J. Sylvester, acknowledges that:

Unlike the CIA program, research subjects [at Edgewood] all signed informed consent forms, both a general one and another related to any experiment they were to participate in. Experiments were carried out with safety of subjects a principal focus. [...] At Edgewood, even at the highest doses it often took an hour or more for incapacitating effects to show, and the end-effects usually did not include full incapacitation, let alone unconsciousness. After all, the Edgewood experimenters were focused on disabling soldiers in combat, where there would be tactical value simply in disabling the enemy.

=== Lawsuits ===
The U.S. Army believed that legal liability could be avoided by concealing the experiments. However, once the experiments were uncovered, the U.S. Senate also concluded questionable legality of the experiments and strongly condemned them.

In the Army's tests, as with those of the CIA, individual rights were ... subordinated to national security considerations; informed consent and follow-up examinations of subjects were neglected in efforts to maintain the secrecy of the tests. Finally, the command and control problems which were apparent in the CIA's programs are paralleled by a lack of clear authorization and supervision in the Army's programs.(S. Rep., at 411.[5])

In the 1990s, the law firm Morrison & Foerster agreed to take on a class-action lawsuit against the government related to the Edgewood volunteers. The plaintiffs collectively referred to themselves as the "Test Vets".

In 2009, a lawsuit was filed by veterans rights organizations Vietnam Veterans of America, and Swords to Plowshares, and eight Edgewood veterans or their families against CIA, the U.S. Army, and other agencies. The complaint asked the court to determine that defendants' actions were illegal and that the defendants have a duty to notify all victims and to provide them with health care. In the suit, Vietnam Veterans of America, et al. v. Central Intelligence Agency, et al. Case No. CV-09-0037-CW, U.S.D.C. (N.D. Cal. 2009), the plaintiffs did not seek monetary damages. Instead, they sought only declaratory and injunctive relief and redress for what they claimed was several decades of neglect and the U.S. government's use of them as human guinea pigs in chemical and biological agent testing experiments.

The plaintiffs cited:

- The use of troops to test nerve gas, psychochemicals, and thousands of other toxic chemical or biological substances.
- A failure to secure informed consent and other widespread failures to follow the precepts of U.S. and international law regarding the use of human subjects, including the 1953 Wilson Directive and the Nuremberg Code.
- A refusal to satisfy their legal and moral obligations to locate the victims of experiments or to provide health care or compensation to them
- A deliberate destruction of evidence and files documenting their illegal actions, actions which were punctuated by fraud, deception, and a callous disregard for the value of human life.

On July 24, 2013, United States District Court Judge Claudia Wilken issued an order granting in part and denying in part plaintiffs' motion for summary judgment and granting in part and denying in part defendants' motion for summary judgment. The court resolved all of the remaining claims in the case and vacated trial. The court granted the plaintiffs partial summary judgment concerning the notice claim: summarily adjudicating in plaintiffs' favor, finding that "the Army has an ongoing duty to warn" and ordering "the Army, through the DVA or otherwise, to provide test subjects with newly acquired information that may affect their well-being that it has learned since its original notification, now and in the future as it becomes available". The court granted the defendants' motion for summary judgment with respect to the other claims.

On appeal in Vietnam Veterans of America v. Central Intelligence Agency, a panel majority held in July 2015 that Army Regulation 70-25 (AR 70-25) created an independent duty to provide ongoing medical care to veterans who participated in U.S. chemical and biological testing programs. The prior finding held that the Army has an ongoing duty to seek out and provide "notice" to former test participants of any new information that could potentially affect their health.

== List of notable EA (Edgewood Arsenal) numbered chemicals ==
- EA 1152 - Diisopropyl fluorophosphate (DFP), an irreversible anti-cholinesterase
- EA 1205 - Tabun (GA)
- EA 1208 - Sarin (GB)
- EA 1210 - Soman (GD)
- EA 1212 - Cyclosarin (GF)
- EA 1285 - Tetraethyl pyrophosphate (TEPP), a highly-toxic acetylcholinesterase inhibitor
- EA 1298 - Methylenedioxyamphetamine (MDA), an analogue and active metabolite of MDMA
- EA 1508 - VG
- EA 1517 - VE
- EA 1653 - LSD in tartrate form
- EA 1664 - Edemo (VM)
- EA 1701 - VX
- EA 1729 - LSD in free base form
- EA 1779 - CS gas
- EA 2092 - Benactyzine, a withdrawn antidepressant and anxiolytic which shows deliriant and hallucinogenic effects
- EA 2148-A - Phencyclidine (PCP)
- EA 2233 - A dimethylheptylpyran variant, a synthetic cannabanoid and THC analogue
  - Eight individual isomers numbered EA-2233-1 through EA-2233-8
- EA 2277 - BZ ("Substance 78" to Soviets)
- EA 3148 - A "V-series" nerve agent, Cyclopentyl S-2-diethylaminoethyl methylphosphonothiolate ("Substance 100A" to Soviets)
- EA 3167 - A BZ variant
- EA 3443 - A BZ variant
- EA 3528 - LSD in maleate form
- EA 3580 - A BZ variant
- EA 3834 - A BZ variant
- EA-4929 - An enantiomer of the drug Dexetimide, also known as benzetimide a piperidine anticholinergic
- EA 4942 - Etonitazene in free base form, an opioid 1,000 to 1,500 times more powerful than morphine
- EA 5365 - GV
- EA 5823 - Sarin (GB) as a binary agent from mixing OPA (isopropyl alcohol+isopropyl amine) + DF

== List of notable CS (Chemical Structure) and CAS (Chemical Abstracts Service) numbered chemicals used in the Edgewood Arsenal Experiments ==
The following chemicals were identified by the National Academies of Sciences, Engineering, and Medicine as having been used in the Edgewood Arsenal Experiments, though they did not receive an EA number designation.

- CS 12602 - Tacrine an acetylcholinesterase inhibitor and indirect cholinergic agonist (parasympathomimetic)
- CS 58525 - Eserine a highly toxic parasympathomimetic alkaloid, specifically, a reversible cholinesterase inhibitor
- CAS 59-99-4 - Neostigmine an acetylcholinesterase inhibitor
- CAS 317–52–2 - Hexafluronium bromide a nicotinic acetylcholine receptor antagonist related to Curare
- CAS 155–97–5 - Pyridostigmine bromide an acetylcholinesterase inhibitor implicated in Gulf War syndrome
- CAS 121–75–5 - Malathion an acetylcholinesterase inhibitor and organophosphate pesticide
- CAS 62–51–1 - Methacholine, a synthetic choline ester that acts as a non-selective muscarinic receptor agonist
- CAS 674-38-4 - Bethanechol, a parasympathomimetic choline carbamate
- CAS 51–34–3 - Scopolamine an anticholinergic drug studied by the CIA as a truth serum
- CAS 8015–54–1 - Ditran an anticholinergic drug mixture, related to the chemical warfare agent 3-Quinuclidinyl benzilate
- CAS 101-31-5 - Hyoscyamine a levorotary isomer of atropine
- CAS 155–41–9 - Methylscopolamine bromide a muscarinic antagonist scopolamine derivative
- CAS 31610-87-4 - Methylatropine a belladonna derivative

== See also ==
- Fort Detrick
- Rankism
- Medical abuse
- Psychological abuse
- Institutional abuse
- Human rights abuses
- THC-O-acetate
- United States chemical weapons program
- Edgewood Chemical Biological Center
- Human experimentation in the United States
- Swords to Plowshares
- United States v. Stanley
