= Pimethixene =

Chemical compound

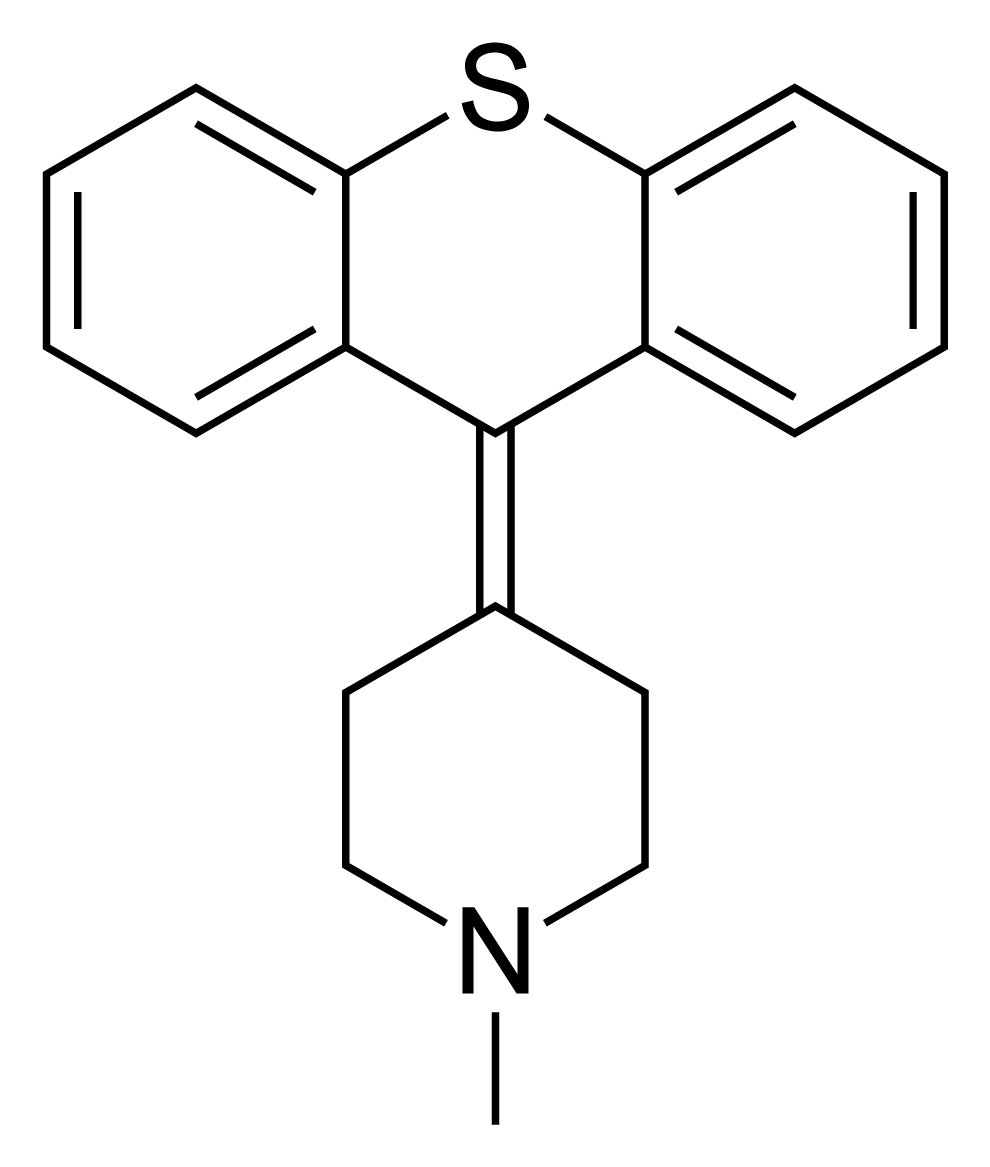

Clinical data
- AHFS/Drugs.com: International Drug Names
- Routes of administration: Oral, nasal
- ATC code: R06AX23 (WHO)

Identifiers
- IUPAC name: 1-Methyl-4-(9H-thioxanthen-9-ylidene)piperidine
- CAS Number: 314-03-4
- PubChem CID: 4822
- ChemSpider: 4656
- UNII: T46J20J26F
- KEGG: D07406
- ChEMBL: ChEMBL152408
- CompTox Dashboard (EPA): DTXSID0048476
- ECHA InfoCard: 100.005.675

Chemical and physical data
- Formula: C_{19}H_{19}NS
- Molar mass: 293.43 g·mol^{−1}
- 3D model (JSmol): Interactive image
- SMILES: S2c1ccccc1/C(c3c2cccc3)=C4/CCN(C)CC4
- InChI: InChI=1S/C19H19NS/c1-20-12-10-14(11-13-20)19-15-6-2-4-8-17(15)21-18-9-5-3-7-16(18)19/h2-9H,10-13H2,1H3; Key:NZLVRVYNQYGMAB-UHFFFAOYSA-N

Pimethixene is an antihistamine and anticholinergic of the thioxanthene chemical class originally developed to treat hyperactivity, anxiety, sleep disorders, and allergy. It is also used for anesthesia and as a bronchodilator (to dilate the bronchi and bronchioles for more airflow).

In combination with pholcodine, it was sold in France by Laboratoires Salvoxyl in the 1970s as the antitussive Salvodex. Pimethixene alone is still available in Brazil under the trade name Muricalm.

In addition to its other activities, it is a highly potent but non-selective serotonin 5-HT_{2B} receptor antagonist. The selective serotonin 5-HT_{2B} receptor antagonist BF-1 was derived from pimethixene.

== See also ==
- Thioxanthene
