= Mepenzolate =

Chemical compound

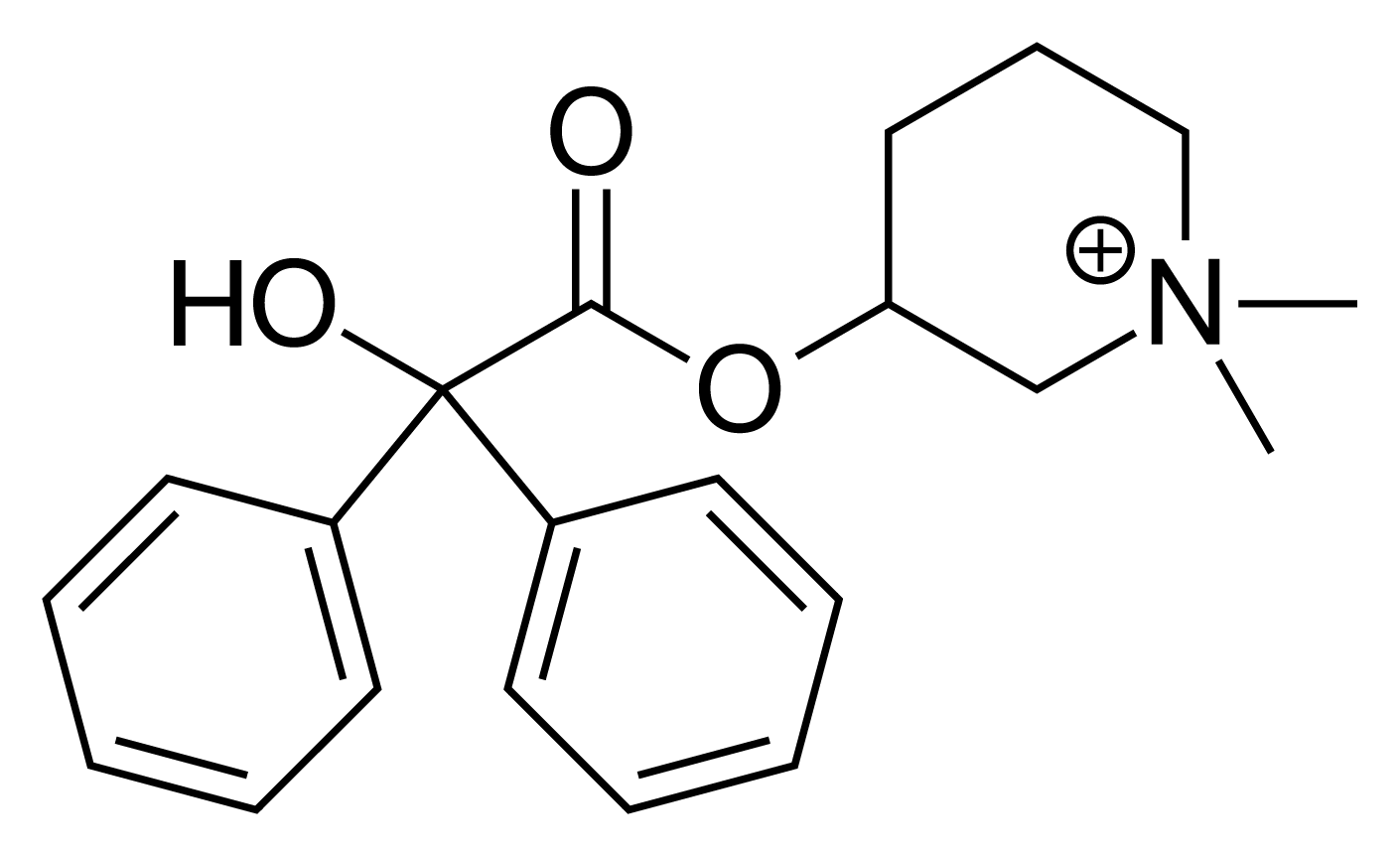

Clinical data
- AHFS/Drugs.com: Consumer Drug Information
- ATC code: A03AB12 (WHO)

Identifiers
- IUPAC name: 3-(2-Hydroxy-2,2-diphenylacetoxy)-1,1-dimethylpiperidinium
- CAS Number: 25990-43-6
- PubChem CID: 4057
- ChemSpider: 3917
- UNII: ONW3LB39P7
- KEGG: C07818
- ChEMBL: ChEMBL524004
- CompTox Dashboard (EPA): DTXSID2046969

Chemical and physical data
- Formula: C_{21}H_{26}NO_{3}^{+}
- Molar mass: 340.443 g·mol^{−1}
- 3D model (JSmol): Interactive image
- SMILES: C[N+]1(C)CC(OC(C(C2=CC=CC=C2)(O)C3=CC=CC=C3)=O)CCC1

Mepenzolate is an antimuscarinic medication primarily used to treat peptic ulcers by reducing stomach acid secretion. It is the methylated version of N-methyl-3-piperidyl benzilate.

== Pharmacology ==
Mepenzolate works by blocking the action of acetylcholine on muscarinic receptors in the gastrointestinal tract. This action reduces the secretion of stomach acid and slows intestinal motility, making it useful in the management of peptic ulcers and other gastrointestinal disorders.

== Chemical structure ==
The chemical structure of mepenzolate is characterized by the presence of a piperidyl group attached to a benzilate moiety, with an additional methyl group. This structure is similar to that of N-methyl-3-piperidyl benzilate, but with a methylation that enhances its antimuscarinic properties.

== Clinical Uses ==
Mepenzolate is primarily indicated for the treatment of peptic ulcers. It may also be used off-label for other conditions where reduction of gastrointestinal motility and secretion is desired.

== Side Effects ==
Mepenzolate has several side effects. Common side effects of mepenzolate include dry mouth, blurred vision, constipation, and urinary retention. These side effects are typical of antimuscarinic agents due to their action on muscarinic receptors throughout the body.
