= N-Ethyl-3-piperidyl benzilate =

Chemical compound

Legal status
- Legal status: DE: Anlage I (Authorized scientific use only); US: Schedule I

Identifiers
- IUPAC name: (1-ethylpiperidin-3-yl) 2-hydroxy-2,2-di(phenyl)acetate
- CAS Number: 3567-12-2
- PubChem CID: 62504
- ChemSpider: 56281
- UNII: 02J52696MZ
- ChEMBL: ChEMBL342669
- CompTox Dashboard (EPA): DTXSID20863199

Chemical and physical data
- Formula: C_{21}H_{25}NO_{3}
- Molar mass: 339.435 g·mol^{−1}
- 3D model (JSmol): Interactive image
- SMILES: O=C(OC1CCCN(CC)C1)C(O)(c2ccccc2)c3ccccc3
- InChI: InChI=1S/C21H25NO3/c1-2-22-15-9-14-19(16-22)25-20(23)21(24,17-10-5-3-6-11-17)18-12-7-4-8-13-18/h3-8,10-13,19,24H,2,9,14-16H2,1H3; Key:OJYOTLHNSMYONM-UHFFFAOYSA-N

N-Ethyl-3-piperidyl benzilate (JB-318) is an anticholinergic drug related to the chemical warfare agent 3-Quinuclidinyl benzilate.

N-Ethyl-3-piperidyl benzilate is less potent and shorter acting than 3-quinuclidyl benzilate, but like 3-QNB its effects on the central nervous system predominate over peripheral effects. It produces deliriant and hallucinogenic effects similar to those of plants such as datura and may be used recreationally at low doses; however, unpleasant side effects such as dysphoria, nausea and vomiting, dizziness and extreme dry mouth tend to make abuse of drugs of this kind uncommon. In 1960, it was compared to LSD for its "atropine-like autonomic effects."

Both the N-methyl and N-ethyl analogues of 3-piperidyl benzilate are, however, Schedule I controlled drugs.

Radiolabelled versions of this drug have been used in scientific research to map the distribution of muscarinic acetylcholine receptors in the brain, however this drug has slightly lower binding affinity than the N-methyl analogue and so is less potent and not so widely used for this application.

Ram Dass, in his book Be Here Now, describes taking JB-318 as part of an experiment at Millbrook: "I was sitting on the 3rd floor and it seemed like nothing was happening at all. And into the room walked a girl from the community with a pitcher of lemonade and she said, would I like some lemonade, and I said that would be great, and she poured the lemonade, and she poured it and she kept pouring and the lemonade went over the side of the glass and fell to the floor and it went across the floor and up the wall and over the ceiling and down the wall and under my pants which got wet and it came back up into the glass—and when it touched the glass the glass disappeared and the lemonade disappeared and the wetness in my pants disappeared and the girl disappeared and I turned around to Ralph Metzner and I said, “Ralph, the most extraordinary thing happened to me,” and Ralph disappeared!"

== See also ==
- N-methyl-3-piperidyl benzilate
- 3-Quinuclidinyl benzilate
- Ditran
