= EA-3167 =

Anticholinergic deliriant drug

Identifiers
- IUPAC name: 1-Azabicyclo[2.2.2]octan-8-yl 2-cyclopentyl-2-hydroxy-2-phenylethanoate
- CAS Number: 26758-53-2
- PubChem CID: 33597
- ChemSpider: 30995
- ChEMBL: ChEMBL13050
- CompTox Dashboard (EPA): DTXSID60949567

Chemical and physical data
- Formula: C_{20}H_{27}NO_{3}
- Molar mass: 329.440 g·mol^{−1}
- 3D model (JSmol): Interactive image
- SMILES: C1CCC(C1)C(C2=CC=CC=C2)(C(=O)OC3CN4CCC3CC4)O
- InChI: InChI=1S/C20H27NO3/c22-19(24-18-14-21-12-10-15(18)11-13-21)20(23,17-8-4-5-9-17)16-6-2-1-3-7-16/h1-3,6-7,15,17-18,23H,4-5,8-14H2; Key:RFXCNPOWSCFJCD-UHFFFAOYSA-N

EA-3167 is a potent and long-lasting anticholinergic deliriant drug, related to the chemical warfare agent 3-quinuclidinyl benzilate (QNB) and to the bronchodilator drug tiotropium bromide. It was developed under contract to Edgewood Arsenal during the 1960s as part of the US military chemical weapons program, in an attempt to develop non-lethal incapacitating agents. EA-3167 has identical effects to QNB (EA-2277), but is even more potent and longer-lasting, with an effective dose when administered by injection of as little as 2.5 μg/kg (i.e. 0.2 milligrams for an 80 kg person), and a duration of 120–240 hours (5–10 days). However unlike QNB, EA-3167 was never weaponized or manufactured in bulk.

Stereoisomers of EA-3167 have also been synthesized under the codename HL-031120.

== Effects ==
Incapacitating effects can last anywhere from 5-10 days, sometimes manifesting as a full 3-day peak of vivid hallucinations, along with prolonged confusion, amnesia, and inhibition of speech and cognition. Some subjects exposed to the drug would not fully recover for almost 20 days. Even six months after exposure, a few subjects demonstrated significant increases in the scores on the hypochondriasis, depression, hysteria, psychasthenia, schizophrenia, and mania scales. The drug's potency caught the attention of the military, which considered weaponizing EA-3167 for topical use, potentially even through a handshake. However, weaponization and further studies were eventually abandoned, possibly due to the extreme nature of its effects and the strain on available study resources caused by conducting human studies for extended periods.

== See also ==
- Edgewood Arsenal human experiments
- N-Methyl-3-piperidyl benzilate
- N-Ethyl-3-piperidyl benzilate
- 3-Quinuclidinyl benzilate
- Ditran
