= Deliriant =

Class of psychoactive drugs

- Drug class
- Chemical structure of scopolamine, one of the most well-known deliriants.

Class identifiers
- Synonyms: Antimuscarinic; Anticholinergic; Muscarinic antagonist; Muscarinic acetylcholine receptor antagonist
- Use: Recreational, medical
- Mechanism of action: Muscarinic acetylcholine receptor antagonism
- Biological target: Muscarinic acetylcholine receptors
- Chemical class: Various

Legal status
- Legal status: Non-controlled

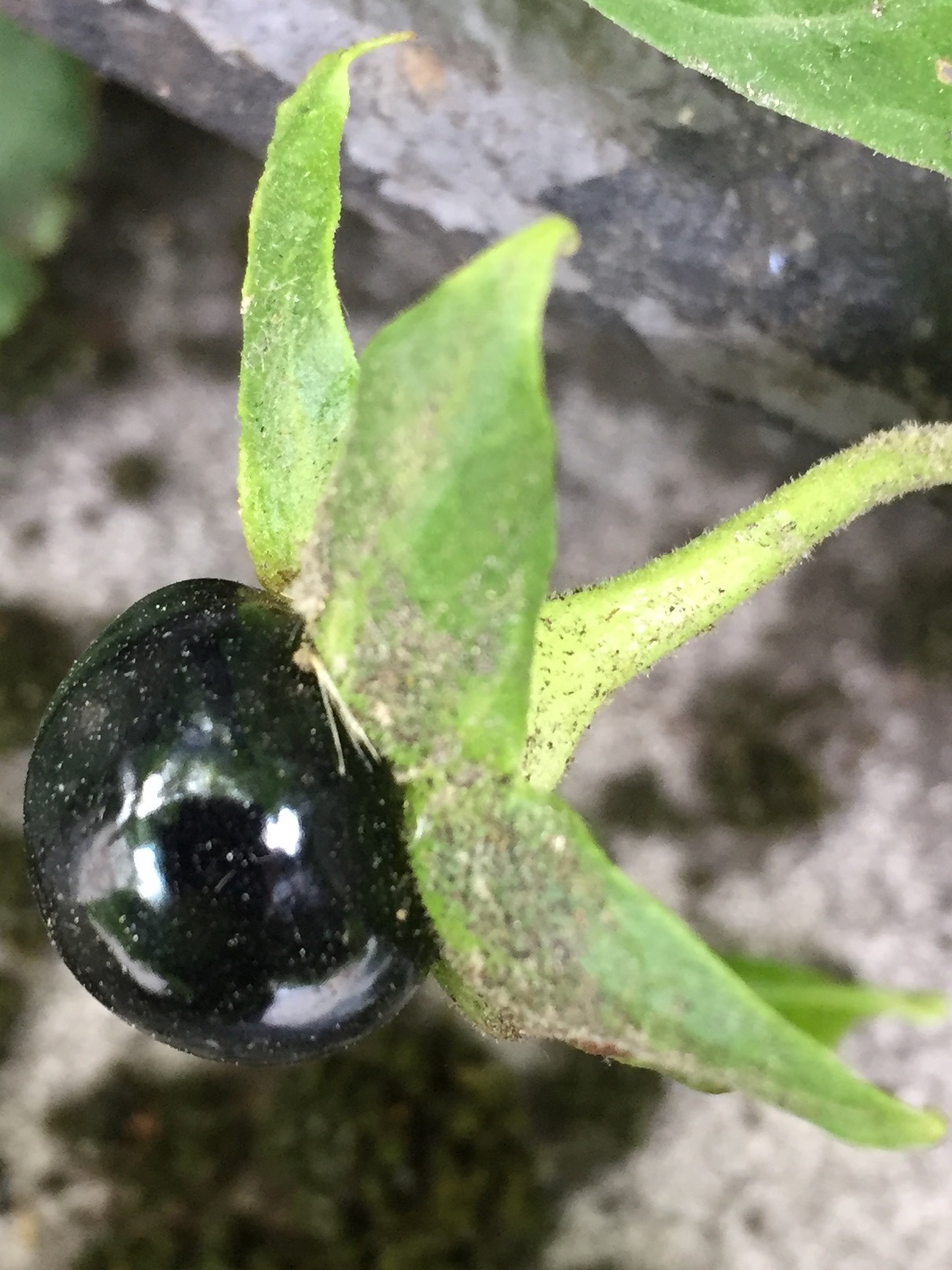
The toxic berry of Atropa belladonna which contains the tropane deliriants scopolamine, atropine, and hyoscyamine.

Deliriants are a subclass of hallucinogen. The term was coined in the early 1980s to distinguish these drugs from psychedelics such as LSD and dissociatives such as ketamine, due to their primary effect of causing delirium, as opposed to the more lucid and less disturbed states produced by other types of hallucinogens, where rational thought is better preserved (including the ability to distinguish hallucinations from reality). The term generally refers to anticholinergic drugs, which are substances that inhibit the function of the neurotransmitter acetylcholine.

Common examples of deliriants include plants of the genera Datura and Brugmansia, both containing scopolamine, as well as higher than recommended dosages of diphenhydramine (Benadryl). A number of plant deliriants such as that of the Solanaceae family, particularly in the Americas, have been used by some Indigenous cultures to reach delirious and altered states of consciousness for traditions or rituals, such as rites of passage, divination or communicating with the ancestors. Despite their long history of use, deliriants are the least-studied class of hallucinogens in terms of their behavioral and neurological effects.

== Etymology ==
The term was introduced by David F. Duncan and Robert S. Gold due to a characteristic delirium-like effect which is known to manifest as a reoccurring symptom for anticholinergic hallucinogens. The term deliriant originates from delirium (dēlīrĭum) which comes from the Latin verb delirare, which means 'to go off the furrow', 'to derail'. liria (furrow) - The earth thrown up between two furrows, a ridge. ex, e - out of, from. delirio - frenzy, madness, deranged. It is said to be a figurative reference to going off or out of the furrow when ploughing (agricultural) so as to be analogous to the mental aberration that is being in delirium.

== Mechanism of action ==
The altered state of consciousness produced by common or 'classical' deliriant substances such as scopolamine, atropine and diphenhydramine is mediated through the drug compounds' competitive antagonism of the peripheral and central muscarinic acetylcholine receptors, especially the M_{1} muscarinic receptor. M_{1} receptors are located primarily in the central nervous system and are involved in perception, attention, and cognitive functioning.

Delirium is primarily associated with antagonism of postsynaptic M_{1} receptors. However, antagonism of both the M_{1} receptor and the M_{2} receptor have been implicated as having negative effects on memory and cognition, and the selective M_{2} receptor antagonist hyoscyamine has been reported to produce deliriant effects similarly to M_{1} receptor antagonists. Conversely, the M_{3} receptor has not been implicated in cognition.

The central nervous system actions of deliriants are complex, and other muscarinic acetylcholine receptors, including the M_{3}, M_{4}, and M_{5} receptors, may also be involved in the effects of the drugs. As an example, the M_{1}, M_{2}, M_{4} and M_{5} receptors have all been implicated in regulating dopamine release, with the M_{1}, M_{2}, and M_{4} receptors having inhibitory effects on dopamine release and the M_{5} receptor having stimulatory effects.

Peripheral muscarinic receptors are part of the autonomic nervous system. M_{2} receptors are located in the brain and heart, M_{3} receptors are in salivary glands and M_{4} receptors are in the brain and lungs. Scopolamine is a nonspecific muscarinic antagonist at all four (M_{1}, M_{2}, M_{3}, and M_{4}) receptor sites. Due to these compounds' inhibition of various signal transduction pathways, the decrease in acetylcholine signaling is what leads to many of the cognitive deficits and mental impairments.

It has also been said that common anticholinergic agents/hallucinogens should be more accurately referred to as antimuscarinics, as for instance these agents do not generally block nicotinic receptors.

== Effects ==
The hallucinogenic experience and delirium produced, particularly by (M_{1} inhibiting) anticholinergics is characterized by stupor, agitation, confusion, confabulation, emotional bluntness, dysphoria, memory deficits, incoherency of thoughts, hypoactivity or hyperactivity (mixed delirium), lucid intervals, akathisia, realistic visual hallucinations or illusions (as opposed to the pseudohallucinations experienced on other classes of hallucinogens) and regression to "phantom" behaviors such as disrobing, plucking or interacting with imaginary objects or scenes. The effects of these kinds of anticholinergic compounds have also been likened to delirious fevers, sleepwalking, fugue states or psychotic episodes in that the subject has minimal control over their actions and may have little or no recollection of the experience afterwards. This is a notable departure from the effects of serotonergic psychedelics.

Scopolamine has been shown to exert a greater impairment on episodic memory, event-related potentials, memory retention and free recall compared to diphenylhydramine (an anticholinergic and antihistamine). Some antihistamines may also act as deliriants in high doses. Due to scopolamine's prominent amnesiac and impairing effects, it has been used in Colombia for criminal purposes such as 'drugging' individuals, usually perceived as wealthy, and robbing them due to scopolamine's discombobulating effects and enhanced suggestibility. It is usually done by putting the extracted and isolated powder form of the alkaloid in a victim's (alcoholic) drink, oftentimes directly by or with the help of attractive women to act as criminal accomplices to the robbers.

In Colombia, isolated (powdered) scopolamine has become infamous and is referred to there by several monikers such as Burundanga and "Devil's Breath". It is usually extracted by criminals from the Borrachero Tree and may even occasionally be encountered as a street drug there.

The antimuscarinic plant-based alkaloids scopolamine and atropine are also notorious for their characteristic hyperactive effects and ability to cause stark and dream-like hallucinations. The hallucinations themselves are often described by users as disturbing, unpleasant or dark in nature. Other commonly reported behaviors and experiences include holding conversations with imagined persons or entities, smoking nonexistent cigarettes (even with nonsmokers), visual hallucinations of spiders or shadow figures or being unable to recognize one's own reflection in a mirror. Deliriants in particular appear to be noted for their powerful effects on users' behavior.

Ken Hedges, who was curator of archaeology at the San Diego Museum of Man, and also studied hallucinogen-based Kumeyaay rock art recalled how when he was a student at San Diego's Mount Miguel High School in 1960, two teenage boys in Ojai who sampled datura were found on that town's main street at night; "in a state of mind that could only be called extremely deranged, they were walking from streetlight to streetlight, banging their heads on each pole until they were covered with blood." Hedge claimed that even among Native Americans, "terrifying visions" were often the result for "those who submitted themselves to the plant's power." Anthropological assessment of the sacred Chumash Datura cult in Southern California ascertained that within the tribe, frequent or repeat users of datura tended to gradually become more and more antisocial, often adopting behavior patterns that the rest of the tribe viewed as "capricious malevolence".

During one of his workshops in Hawaii, psychonaut Terence McKenna discussed the effects of the hallucinogenic Solanaceae plants compared to psychedelics, stating:

They (solanaceae deliriants) are psychoactive and interesting. I don't know how much is to be learned there. It seems to me it's a path of power, and it's also a path of danger. They're quite peculiar. It's hard to keep control. It's the drug where people invariably tear their clothes off and run into public. I mean, I don't know why they do that but just over and over again you hear stories of people taking their clothes off and then going into public… In Nepal, there is Datura metel, which is the conspecific species to Datura meteloides in North America, and we would grind it up and take the seeds and… it's freaky. It doesn't teach you about higher consciousness, it sort of leads you into a world of twilight confusion and magical and somewhat demonic forces… A lot of sorcery goes on around datura, especially in Latin America. It's a strange world. A world of shadows and forces, and shifting boundaries.

During an on-camera interview, author of The God Molecule: 5-MeO-DMT and the Spiritual Path to the Divine Light, Gerardo Ruben Sandoval Isaac explained that in the Oaxaca "mushroom village" of San José del Pacifico, the psilocybin mushrooms are regarded as being "related to light" and that (Brugmansia) is "related to the darkness" and that they (the tribes) "are aware of the polarity of this flower", further crediting the idea that the hallucinogenic experience produced by deliriants is typically of a "dark" and disturbing nature. When datura was first formally discovered in colonial Jamestown, Virginia in 1676 by English soldiers during Bacon's Rebellion, they spent 11 days in altered mental states after using the leaves of the plant, which they did not know were psychoactive and poisonous, as part of a salad.

Historian Robert Beverley Jr. wrote of the observable effects seen during their intoxicated state; "They (the soldiers) turned natural fools upon it for several days: one would blow up a feather in the air; another would dart straws at it with much fury; and another, stark naked, was sitting up in a corner like a monkey, grinning and making mows (grimaces) at them; a fourth would fondly kiss and paw his companions, and sneer in their faces with a countenance more antic than any in a Dutch droll… They were not very cleanly; for they would have wallowed in their own excrements if they had not been prevented. A thousand such simple tricks they played, and after eleven days returned (to) themselves again, not remembering anything that had passed."

== Deliriant substances ==
Datura stramonium (jimsonweed) 4-valved seed capsule

Naturally-occurring anticholinergic deliriants are found in the plant species Atropa belladonna (deadly nightshade), various Brugmansia species (Angel's Trumpets), Datura stramonium (Jimson weed), Hyoscyamus niger (henbane), and Mandragora officinarum (mandrake) in the form of the tropane alkaloids scopolamine, atropine, and hyoscyamine. Other, lesser known plant sources of scopolamine and related tropanes include Scopolia carniolica endemic to Europe, Latua endemic to southern Chile, Solandra endemic to Mexico and Duboisia myoporoides, which is endemic to Australia and contains both scopolamine and nicotine. Scopolamine has often been considered, pharmacologically and psychonautically the premier and paradigmatic deliriant substance, to which all other deliriants and/or antimuscarinic hallucinogens are usually compared.

Synthetic compounds such as diphenhydramine (Benadryl), dimenhydrinate (Dramamine), and tropine benzilate are deliriants. Nutmeg, although purportedly not as strong or as unpleasant as diphenhydramine or scopolamine, is considered a deliriant, due to its propensity to cause anticholinergic-like symptoms when taken in large doses. The effects caused by myristicin and elemicin found in nutmeg's essential oil can last up to several days, similarly to the tropane alkaloids found in datura. The mushroom referred to as fly agaric with its active agents ibotenic acid and muscimol may also be considered an 'atypical' deliriant, although fly agaric is probably more accurately described as a hypnotic.

In rare cases, highly toxic plants from the Aconitum (wolfsbane) genus have been used as "deliriants" by certain groups practicing European witchcraft, the left-hand path or asceticism due to the unpleasant but supposed altered state of consciousness which can be a side effect of wolfsbane poisoning. Plants of the aconitum genus contain the neurotoxin aconitine and in the case of Aconitum ferox, an extremely toxic alkaloid called pseudaconitine, which is in rare cases, taken as an ordeal poison and entheogen on the Indian subcontinent by ascetic groups such as the Aghori, where it may be mixed with other psychoactive plants or poisons such as datura and cannabis. Risk of death is considered very high when taking A. ferox and its use is restricted to only the most experienced adepts of their particular school of Shivaism.

== Recreational use ==
Despite the fully legal status of several common deliriant plants and OTC medicines, deliriants are largely unpopular as recreational drugs due to the severe dysphoria, uncomfortable and generally damaging cognitive and physical effects, as well as the unpleasant nature of the hallucinations. Anticholinergics are said to be typically responsible for 15–20% of acute poisoning admissions, up to 40% of poisoning admission to intensive care units and 16% of poison centre calls. The anticholinergic syndrome may be accompanied by sedation, coma, seizures and/or cardiovascular toxicity not necessarily mediated by muscarinic antagonism but rather secondary to other drug effects on other receptors or ion channels. In theory, an ideal antidote for the anticholinergic syndrome caused by these particular substances would be a selective M_{1} receptor agonist. Some are in development but reportedly as of 2016, none are in clinical use.

Ultimately, user reports of recreational deliriant usage on the drug resource website Erowid also generally indicate a firm unwillingness to repeat the experience. In addition to potentially dangerous mental/behavioral effects (accidents during deliriant experiences are common) some tropane alkaloids, such as those found in plants of the Datura genus, are exceptionally toxic and can cause death due to tachycardia-induced heart failure, hypoventilation and hyperthermia even in small doses. Anticholinergics have been shown to increase the risk of developing dementia with long-term use, even at therapeutic doses, therefore they are presumed to carry an even greater risk when used at hallucinogenic dosages. Scopolamine in particular has been implemented in scientific models used to study the cholinergic hypothesis for Alzheimer's disease and other related dementias.

Despite these overtly negative effects both on the physical and mental health of the user, usage of deliriants for recreational purposes has still gone on for centuries and was said to be introduced in Europe and surrounding areas by the Romani people, who would smoke or ingest plants such as datura to experience hallucinations. It has been said that certain groups who used deliriant plants, especially in hedgewitchery (wortcunning) practices, would traditionally mix in medicinal or neuroprotective plants either directly during the intoxications or later on to counter negative health consequences or symptoms such as dysphoria or senility.

== Occultism and folklore ==
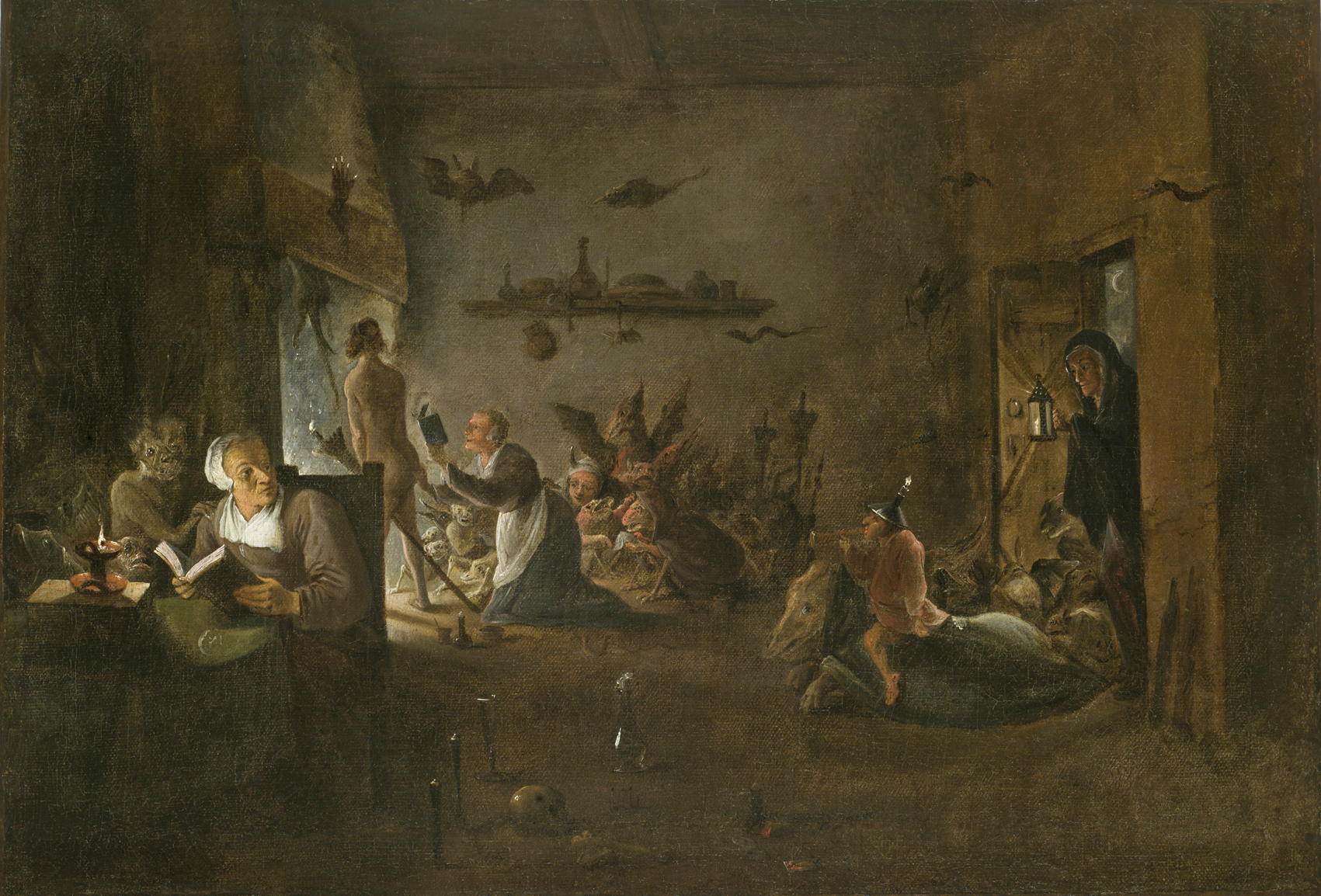
Preparation for the Witches' Sabbath by David Teniers the Younger. Note on the left, an older witch reading from a grimoire, while anointing the buttocks of a young witch about to fly to the sabbath upon an inverted besom, with a candle upon its twigs

Deliriants such as henbane, belladonna, mandrake, jimsonweed and fly agaric are associated with and featured in many stories and beliefs within European mythology. In ancient Greek myth, wreaths of henbane leaves were used to crown the newly deceased to make them forget their former lives as they crossed or wandered near the River Styx in the underworld. The belladonna plant genus, Atropa is named after the Greek Fate, Atropos, who cut the thread of life. In early medieval times, Mandrake was believed to have commonly grown under gallows where bodily fluids dripped from the bodies of deceased murderers, with some sources stating blood and others claiming semen or urine.

Tropane-containing nightshades have played an integral role in Old World folklore and European witchcraft. Henbane is reputed for having been used in Greco-Roman magic during ancient times as well as being associated with black magic and maleficium during the Late Middle Ages. During this period in medieval Europe, the Central European species Scopolia carniolica was also used as an admixture in love potions. Belladonna was purported to aid in the "flight of witches" where they reportedly would experience "bacchanalian carousal" or hallucinatory dreaming.

Mandrake (the root of Mandragora officinarum) is mentioned twice in the Bible, and was also frequently mentioned as a typical ingredient in flying ointment recipes since at least as far back as the Early Modern Period. During this time period, the New World plant datura stramonium (jimsonweed) was discovered in North America by colonialists and eventually lumped in with the other classic 'witches weeds' of the nightshade family that were endemic to Europe. Datura has a long history of usage both in Mexico and the Southwestern United States by indigenous cultures using it for ritualistic, sacred and magical purposes.

In modern times, both Datura and Brugmansia are still used for sorcery, black magic, and shamanism in Latin America. In certain South American countries, members of the Brugmansia genus have been known to be occasionally added to ayahuasca brews by malevolent sorcerers (brujos) or bad shamans who wish to take advantage of unsuspecting tourists. Genuine shamans (curanderos) believe one of the purposes for this is to "steal one's energy and/or power", of which they believe every person has a limited amount.

Since medieval times, extremely noxious plants of the Aconitum (wolfsbane) genus were also associated with folklore and magic and were used for similar purposes as the tropane-containing nightshades. Despite being a highly poisonous and often deadly plant to work with, it was still often included in recipes for flying ointments and magical salves, likely as a way to help counteract both the cardiac and hyperthermic side effects of the scopolamine. The aconitum genus (specifically aconitum napellus) was firmly associated with superstition and witchcraft in Europe, particularly when it came to mythos surrounding werewolves and lycanthropy. This is believed to have originated at least partially from wolfsbane's alleged tendency to cause paresthesia which supposedly can be reported to feel like one's body is covered in fur. In Greek mythology, the goddess Hecate is said to have invented aconitum which Athena used to transform Arachne into a spider.

== Classes of deliriants ==
=== Anticholinergics ===
==== Tropanes ====
- Atropine
- Hyoscyamine
- Scopolamine

==== Ethanolamines ====
- Dimenhydrinate
- Diphenhydramine
- Doxylamine (anticholinergic at higher doses)

Disubstituted glycolic acid esters:

- Benactyzine
- Dicyclomine
- N-ethyl-3-piperidyl benzilate
- N-methyl-3-piperidyl benzilate
- 3-quinuclidinyl benzilate
- Ditran
- EA-3167

=== Antihistamines ===
- Buclizine
- Cinnarizine
- Clemastine
- Cyclizine
- Dimenhydrinate
- Diphenhydramine
- Doxylamine
- Hydroxyzine
- Meclizine
- Orphenadrine
- Promethazine

=== Other ===
- Benzydamine
- Elemicin
- Eugenol
- Anethole
- Myristicin
- Ibotenic Acid
- Tropicamide

== See also ==
- Flying ointment
- List of hallucinogens
- Trip report
