= N-Methyl-3-piperidyl benzilate =

Chemical compound

Legal status
- Legal status: DE: Anlage I (Authorized scientific use only); US: Schedule I

Identifiers
- IUPAC name: (1-Methylpiperidin-3-yl) 2-hydroxy-2,2-di(phenyl)acetate
- CAS Number: 3321-80-0
- PubChem CID: 62495
- ChemSpider: 56274
- UNII: 3A5HM769QX
- ChEMBL: ChEMBL139948
- CompTox Dashboard (EPA): DTXSID2046258
- ECHA InfoCard: 100.020.031

Chemical and physical data
- Formula: C_{20}H_{23}NO_{3}
- Molar mass: 325.408 g·mol^{−1}
- 3D model (JSmol): Interactive image
- SMILES: O=C(OC1CCCN(C)C1)C(O)(c2ccccc2)c3ccccc3
- InChI: InChI=1S/C20H23NO3/c1-21-14-8-13-18(15-21)24-19(22)20(23,16-9-4-2-5-10-16)17-11-6-3-7-12-17/h2-7,9-12,18,23H,8,13-15H2,1H3; Key:ZBEILXWHVSVDBN-UHFFFAOYSA-N

N-Methyl-3-piperidyl benzilate (JB-336 or LBJ) is an anticholinergic drug related to the chemical warfare agent 3-quinuclidinyl benzilate.

N-methyl-3-piperidyl benzilate is less potent and shorter acting than 3-quinuclidyl benzilate, but like 3-QNB its effects on the central nervous system predominate over peripheral effects. It produces deliriant and hallucinogenic effects similar to those of plants such as datura and may be used recreationally at low doses; however, unpleasant side effects such as dysphoria, nausea and vomiting, dizziness and extreme dry mouth tend to make abuse of drugs of this kind uncommon. Both the N-methyl and N-ethyl analogues of 3-piperidyl benzilate are, however, Schedule I controlled drugs.

Radiolabelled versions of this drug are used in scientific research to map the distribution of muscarinic acetylcholine receptors in the brain.

Reaction of JB-336 with methyl bromide gives the gastrointestinal drug Mepenzolate bromide.

== See also ==
- N-ethyl-3-piperidyl benzilate
- 3-Quinuclidinyl benzilate
- Ditran
- Azacyclonol
