= Ditran =

Chemical compound

Identifiers
- IUPAC name: mixture of (1-ethylpyrrolidin-2-yl)methyl 2-cyclopentyl-2-hydroxy-2-phenylacetate and (1-ethylpiperidin-3-yl)-2-cyclopentyl-2-hydroxy-2-phenylacetate
- CAS Number: 8015-54-1
- PubChem CID: 111040
- UNII: US46XLX8YH
- ChEMBL: ChEMBL126644

Chemical and physical data
- Formula: C_{20}H_{29}NO_{3}
- Molar mass: 331.456 g·mol^{−1}

Ditran (JB-329) is an anticholinergic drug mixture, related to the chemical warfare agent 3-Quinuclidinyl benzilate (QNB).

Ditran is composed of a mixture of 70% 1-ethyl-2-pyrrolidinylmethyl-alpha- phenylcyclopentylglycolate and 30% 1-ethyl-3-piperidyl-alpha-phenylcyclopentylglycolate. These compounds are structural isomers and have very similar pharmacological properties. The piperidine compound is the more potent of the two and the reason the mixture was used was because of ease of manufacture, however it is also possible to make the piperidine compound in its pure form, so there were ultimately two forms of Ditran used in research, the original 70/30 mix, and "Ditran-B", the pure piperidine compound. Ditran was developed during chemical weapons research in an attempt to produce non-lethal incapacitating agents, similar to QNB itself. The ditran mixture is more potent as an anticholinergic than the piperidyl benzilate drugs such as N-methyl-3-piperidyl benzilate, but is less potent than QNB.

There has been a modest amount of scientific research using this mixture, but most modern research using these kinds of anticholinergic drugs uses N-methyl-3-piperidyl benzilate due to its wider availability.

== See also ==
- N-Methyl-3-piperidyl benzilate
- N-Ethyl-3-piperidyl benzilate
- 3-Quinuclidinyl benzilate
- EA-3167
