= 3-Quinuclidinyl benzilate =

Military incapacitating agent

Bonding model
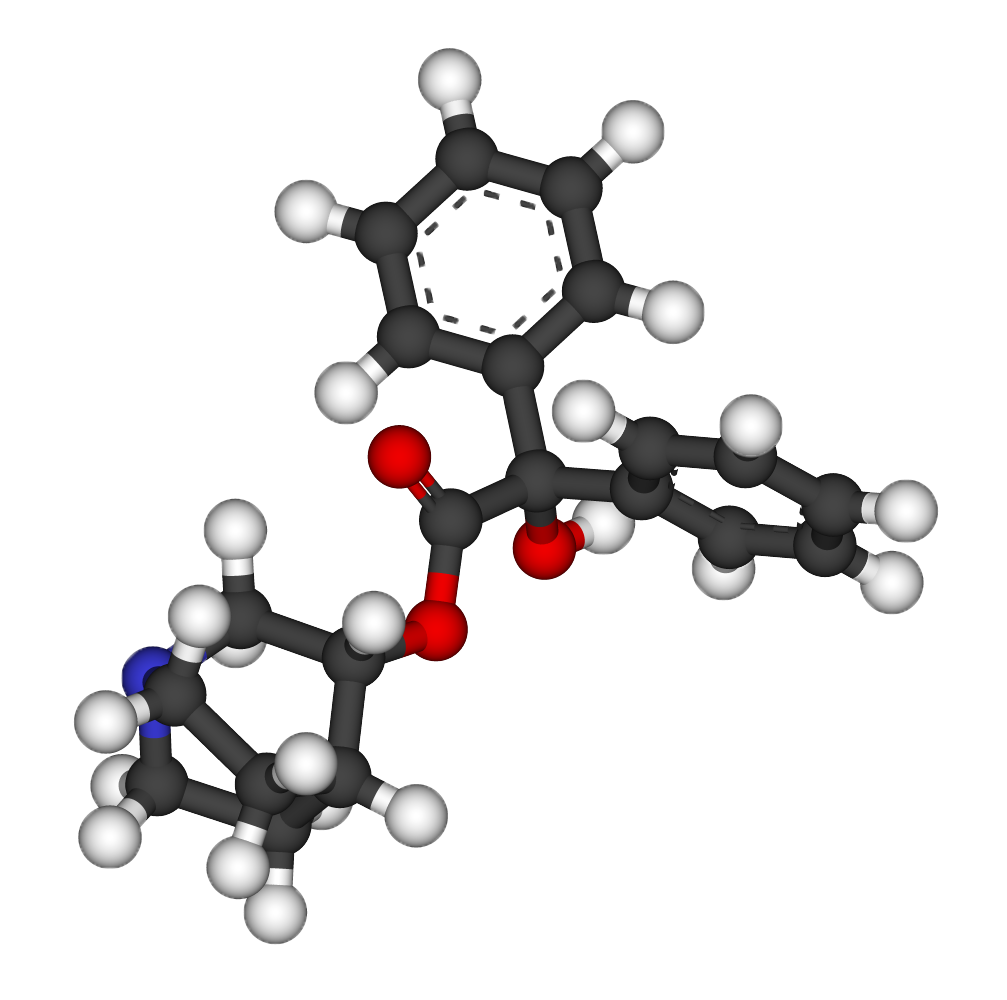
Ball and stick model

Names
- Preferred IUPAC name 1-Azabicyclo[2.2.2]octan-3-yl hydroxydi(phenyl)acetate
- Other names BZ; EA-2277; CS-4030; QNB

Identifiers
| CAS Number | 6581-06-2 |
| 3D model (JSmol) | Interactive image |
| ChEMBL | ChEMBL12980 |
| ChemSpider | 21577 |
| ECHA InfoCard | 100.164.060 |
| IUPHAR/BPS | 3260 |
| MeSH | Quinuclidinyl+benzilate |
| PubChem CID | 23056 |
| UNII | E69DLR7470 |
| CompTox Dashboard (EPA) | DTXSID00894168 |
- InChI: InChI=1S/C21H23NO3/c23-20(25-19-15-22-13-11-16(19)12-14-22)21(24,17-7-3-1-4-8-17)18-9-5-2-6-10-18/h1-10,16,19,24H,11-15H2 Key: HGMITUYOCPPQLE-UHFFFAOYSA-N; InChI=1/C21H23NO3/c23-20(25-19-15-22-13-11-16(19)12-14-22)21(24,17-7-3-1-4-8-17)18-9-5-2-6-10-18/h1-10,16,19,24H,11-15H2 Key: HGMITUYOCPPQLE-UHFFFAOYAEb l
- SMILES: O=C(C(C1=CC=CC=C1)(C2=CC=CC=C2)O)OC3CN4CCC3CC4

Properties
| Chemical formula | C_{21}H_{23}NO_{3} |
| Molar mass | 337.419 g·mol^{−1} |
| Appearance | White crystalline powder |
| Melting point | 164 to 165 °C (327 to 329 °F; 437 to 438 K) |
| Boiling point | 322 °C (612 °F; 595 K) |
- Except where otherwise noted, data are given for materials in their standard state (at 25 °C [77 °F], 100 kPa). verify (what is ?) Infobox references

3-Quinuclidinyl benzilate (QNB) (IUPAC name 1-azabicyclo[2.2.2]octan-3-yl hydroxy(diphenyl)acetate; U.S. Army code EA-2277; NATO code BZ; Soviet code Substance 78) is an odorless and bitter-tasting, military-grade incapacitating agent. It impairs muscle movement and causes delirium and hallucinations to the point of helplessness.

BZ was first synthesized by the Swiss pharmaceutical company Hoffman-LaRoche in 1951, which unsuccessfully tried to develop it into a treatment for gastrointestinal disease. Within a few years, the United States Army took it up as part of its chemical weapons program. Allegations have been made that the U.S. Army used it in the Vietnam War. The Army denies this; in 1969, it officially banned the compound due to its "wide range of variability of effects, long onset time, and inefficiency of existing munitions." There have also been numerous, unproven allegations of its use in Syria, Bosnia and Russia.

== Physicochemical characteristics ==
BZ is a white crystalline powder with a bitter taste. It is odorless and nonirritating with delayed symptoms several hours after contact. It is stable in most solvents, with a half-life of three to four weeks in moist air; even heat-producing munitions can disperse it. It is extremely persistent in soil and water and on most surfaces. BZ is soluble in water, soluble in dilute acids, trichloroethylene, dimethylformamide, and most organic solvents, and insoluble with aqueous alkali.

Structurally, BZ is an ester of benzilic acid joined to a quinuclidine unit and a hydroxy group.

== Effects ==
=== Symptoms ===
Symptoms begin between 30 minutes and several hours of exposure. As a powerful anticholinergic agent, BZ produces a syndrome known as anticholinergic toxidrome: these include a range of psychological and physiological effects, with the most incapacitating effect being a state of delirium characterized by cognitive dysfunction, hallucinations, anxiolysis, and inability to perform basic tasks. The usual syndrome of physical anticholinergic effects are also present, including strong dilation of the pupils (potentially to the point of temporary blindness), fast heart rate, widening of blood vessels, dry mouth, and elevated body temperature. The readily observable symptoms of the anticholinergic toxidrome are famously characterized by the mnemonic "Mad as a hatter, red as a beet, dry as a bone and blind as a bat" (and variations thereof). The effects generally last about three days, though some symptoms may persist up to six weeks.

=== Mechanism of action ===
BZ is an muscarinic antagonist, meaning that it blocks muscarinic acetylcholine receptors, on which the brain relies for memory formation, attention and muscle movement.

== Toxicity ==
Based on data from more than 500 reported cases of accidental atropine overdose and deliberate poisoning, the median lethal oral dose is estimated to be approximately 450 mg (with a shallow probit slope of 1.8). Some estimates of lethality with BZ have been grossly erroneous, and ultimately, the safety margin for BZ is inconclusive due to lack of human data at higher dosage ranges, though some researchers have estimated it to be 0.5 to 3.0 mg/kg and an LD_{01} is 0.2 to 1.4 mg/kg (Rosenblatt, Dacre, Shiotsuka, & Rowlett, 1977).

== Treatment ==
Antidotes for BZ include 7-MEOTA, which can be administered in tablet or injection form. Atropine and tacrine (THA) have also been used as treatments, with THA having been shown to reduce the effects of BZ within minutes. Some military references suggest the use of physostigmine to temporarily increase synaptic acetylcholine concentrations.

== History ==
=== Invention and research ===
BZ was invented by the Swiss pharmaceutical company Hoffman-LaRoche in 1951. The company was investigating antispasmodic agents, similar to tropine, for treating gastrointestinal ailments when the chemical was discovered. It was then investigated for possible use in ulcer treatment, but was found unsuitable. At this time, the United States military investigated it along with a wide range of possible nonlethal, psychoactive and psychotomimetic incapacitating agents including psychedelic drugs such as LSD, dissociative drugs such as ketamine and phencyclidine, potent opioids such as fentanyl, as well as several glycolate anticholinergics. By 1959, the United States Army showed significant interest in deploying it as a chemical warfare agent. It was originally designated "TK", but when it was standardized by the Army in 1961, it received the NATO code name "BZ"; the Chemical Corps initially referred to BZ as CS4030, then later as EA 2277. The agent commonly became known as "Buzz" because of this abbreviation and the effects it had on the mental state of the human volunteers intoxicated with it in research studies at Edgewood Arsenal in Maryland. As described in retired Army psychiatrist James Ketchum's autobiographical book Chemical Warfare: Secrets Almost Forgotten (2006), work proceeded in 1964 when a general envisioned a scheme to incapacitate an entire trawler with aerosolized BZ; this effort was dubbed Project DORK. BZ was ultimately weaponized for delivery in the M44 generator cluster and the M43 cluster bomb, until all such stocks were destroyed in 1989 as part of a general downsizing of the U.S. chemical warfare program.

In 2022 a documentary film, Dr Delirium and The Edgewood Experiments, was broadcast on Discovery+, featuring an interview with Ketchum not previously shown.

=== Use and alleged use ===
Survivors of the 11–12 July 1995 Srebrenica massacre near Tuzla during the Bosnian War claimed that they were attacked with a chemical agent that caused hallucinations, disorientation and strange behaviour.

In February 1998, the British Ministry of Defence accused Iraq of having stockpiled large amounts of a glycolate anticholinergic incapacitating agent known as 'Agent 15'. Agent 15 is an alleged Iraqi incapacitating agent that is likely to be chemically identical to BZ or closely related to it. Agent 15 was reportedly stockpiled in large quantities prior to and during the Persian Gulf War. However, after the war, the CIA concluded that Iraq had not stockpiled or weaponized Agent 15. (Note: "We assess that Iraq never went beyond research with Agent 15 – a hallucinogenic chemical similar to BZ – or any other psychochemical. Agent 15 became an issue after a 9 February 1998 British press release claimed that the UK had information, thought to be reliable, that Iraq had large quantities of this chemical agent in the 1980s. UNSCOM and intelligence information indicated that Iraq researched a number of psychochemicals, including Agent 15, BZ, and PCP; however, UNSCOM indicated it saw no evidence of Iraqi importation of large quantities, weaponization, procurement of militarily significant quantities of precursors, or industrial production of these agents.")

According to Konstantin Anokhin, professor at the Institute of Normal Physiology in Moscow, BZ was the chemical agent used to incapacitate terrorists during the 2002 Nord-Ost siege, resulting in at least 115 hostages perishing due to overdose. However, a 2012 study concluded that a mixture of carfentanil and remifentanil was used instead.

In January 2013, an unidentified U.S. administration official, referring to an undisclosed U.S. State Department cable, claimed that "Syrian contacts made a compelling case that Agent 15, a hallucinogenic chemical similar to BZ, was used in Homs". However, in response to these reports, a U.S. National Security Council spokesman stated,

The reporting we have seen from media sources regarding alleged chemical weapons incidents in Syria has not been consistent with what we believe to be true about the Syrian chemical weapons program.

=== Legality ===
BZ is listed as a Schedule 2 compound by the Organisation for the Prohibition of Chemical Weapons. It sees occasional use in biomedical research, for example to induce Alzheimer's-like symptoms in mice.

== See also ==
- Edgewood Arsenal human experiments
- EA-3167
- EA-3443
- EA-3580
- EA-3834
- Tropine benzilate
