= C19H24N2 =

The molecular formula C_{19}H_{24}N_{2} (molar mass: 280.40 g/mol) may refer to:

- 4-ANPP
- Bamipine
- Daledalin
- Histapyrrodine
- Ibogamine
- Imipramine
- Propazepine
- Yohimban
