= Hydroxyzine =

Antihistamine drug

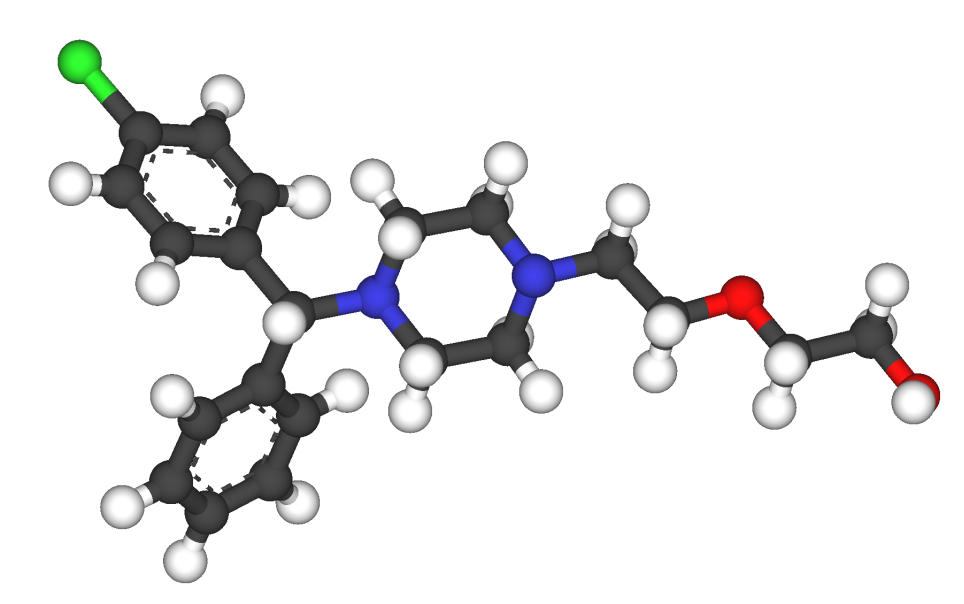

Clinical data
- Pronunciation: /haɪˈdrɒksɪziːn/
- Trade names: Atarax, Vistaril, others
- Other names: UCB-4492
- AHFS/Drugs.com: Monograph
- MedlinePlus: a682866
- License data: US DailyMed: Hydroxyzine
- Dependence liability: Very low
- Addiction liability: None-very low
- Routes of administration: By mouth, intramuscular
- Drug class: First-generation antihistamine; Sedative; Anxiolytic
- ATC code: N05BB01 (WHO) N05BB51 (WHO)

Legal status
- Legal status: AU: S4 (Prescription only); CA: ℞-only; UK: POM (Prescription only); US: ℞-only; EU: Rx-only; SE: Rx-only

Pharmacokinetic data
- Bioavailability: Not known
- Protein binding: Not known
- Metabolism: Liver by CYP3A4 and CYP3A5
- Metabolites: Cetirizine, others
- Elimination half-life: Adults: 20.0 hours; Elderly: 29.3 hours; Children: 7.1 hours
- Excretion: Urine, feces

Identifiers
- IUPAC name: (±)-2-(2-{4-[(4-chlorophenyl)-phenylmethyl]piperazin-1-yl}ethoxy)ethanol
- CAS Number: 68-88-2 10246-75-0 (pamoate); as HCl: 2192-20-3
- PubChem CID: 3658; as HCl: 91513
- IUPHAR/BPS: 7199
- DrugBank: DB00557; as HCl: DBSALT000343
- ChemSpider: 3531; as HCl: 82634
- UNII: 30S50YM8OG; as HCl: 76755771U3
- KEGG: D08054; as HCl: D00672
- ChEBI: CHEBI:5818; as HCl: CHEBI:5819
- ChEMBL: ChEMBL896; as HCl: ChEMBL3186993
- CompTox Dashboard (EPA): DTXSID8023137
- ECHA InfoCard: 100.000.630

Chemical and physical data
- Formula: C_{21}H_{27}ClN_{2}O_{2}
- Molar mass: 374.91 g·mol^{−1}
- 3D model (JSmol): Interactive image
- SMILES: Clc1ccc(cc1)C(c2ccccc2)N3CCN(CC3)CCOCCO
- InChI: InChI=1S/C21H27ClN2O2/c22-20-8-6-19(7-9-20)21(18-4-2-1-3-5-18)24-12-10-23(11-13-24)14-16-26-17-15-25/h1-9,21,25H,10-17H2; Key:ZQDWXGKKHFNSQK-UHFFFAOYSA-N

Hydroxyzine, sold under the brand names Atarax (as hydrochloride) and Vistaril (as pamoate) among others, is an antihistamine medication. It is used in the treatment of itchiness, anxiety, insomnia, and nausea (including that due to motion sickness). It is used either by mouth or injection into a muscle.

Hydroxyzine works by blocking the effects of histamine. It is a first-generation antihistamine in the piperazine family of chemicals. Common side effects include sleepiness, headache, and dry mouth. Serious side effects may include QT prolongation. It is unclear whether use during pregnancy or breastfeeding is safe.

It was first made by Union Chimique Belge in 1956 and was approved for sale by Pfizer in the United States later that year. In 2023, it was the 39th most commonly prescribed medication in the United States, with more than 15 million prescriptions.

== Medical uses ==
Hydroxyzine is used in the treatment of itchiness, anxiety, and nausea due to motion sickness.

A systematic review concluded that hydroxyzine outperforms placebo in treating generalized anxiety disorder. Insufficient data were available to compare the drug with benzodiazepines and buspirone.

Hydroxyzine can also be used for the treatment of allergic conditions, such as chronic urticaria, atopic or contact dermatoses, and histamine-mediated pruritus. These have also been confirmed in both recent and past studies to have no adverse effects on the liver, blood, nervous system, or urinary tract.

Use of hydroxyzine for premedication as a sedative has no effects on tropane alkaloids, such as atropine, but may, following general anesthesia, potentiate meperidine and barbiturates, and use in pre-anesthetic adjunctive therapy should be modified depending upon the state of the individual.

Doses of hydroxyzine hydrochloride used for sleep range from 25 to 100 mg. As with other antihistamine sleep aids, hydroxyzine is usually only prescribed for short term or "as-needed" use since tolerance to the central nervous system (CNS) effects of hydroxyzine can develop in as little as a few days. A major systematic review and network meta-analysis of medications for the treatment of insomnia published in 2022 found little evidence to inform the use of hydroxyzine for insomnia. A 2023 meta-review concludes that hydroxyzine is effective for inducing sleep onset but less effective for maintaining sleep for eight hours.

== Contraindications ==
Hydroxyzine is contraindicated for subcutaneous or intra-articular administration.

The administration of hydroxyzine in large amounts by ingestion or intramuscular administration during the onset of pregnancy can cause fetal abnormalities. When administered to pregnant rats, mice, and rabbits, hydroxyzine caused abnormalities such as hypogonadism with doses significantly above that of the human therapeutic range.

In humans, a significant dose has not yet been established in studies, and, by default, the US Food and Drug Administration (FDA) has introduced contraindication guidelines regarding hydroxyzine. Use by those at risk for or showing previous signs of hypersensitivity is also contraindicated.

Other contraindications include the administration of hydroxyzine alongside depressants and other compounds that affect the central nervous system; if necessary, it should only be administered concomitantly in small doses. If administered in small doses with other substances, as mentioned, then patients should refrain from using dangerous machinery, motor vehicles, or any other practice requiring absolute concentration, under safety laws.

Studies have also been conducted which show that long-term prescription of hydroxyzine can lead to tardive dyskinesia after years of use, but effects related to dyskinesia have also anecdotally been reported after periods of 7.5 months, such as continual head rolling, lip licking, and other forms of athetoid movement. In certain cases, elderly patients' previous interactions with phenothiazine derivatives or pre-existing neuroleptic treatment may have contributed to dyskinesia at the administration of hydroxyzine due to hypersensitivity caused by prolonged treatment, and therefore some contraindication is given for short-term administration of hydroxyzine to those with previous phenothiazine use.

== Side effects ==
Several reactions have been noted in manufacturer guidelines—deep sleep, incoordination, sedation, and dizziness have been reported in children and adults, as well as others such as hypotension, tinnitus, and headaches. Gastrointestinal effects have also been observed, as well as less serious effects such as dryness of the mouth and constipation caused by the mild antimuscarinic properties of hydroxyzine.

Central nervous system effects such as hallucinations or confusion have been observed in rare cases, attributed mostly to overdosage. Such properties have been attributed to hydroxyzine in several cases, particularly in patients treated for neuropsychological disorders, as well as in cases where overdoses have been observed. While there are reports of hallucinogenic effects from use of hydroxyzine, several clinical data trials have not reported such side effects from the sole consumption of hydroxyzine, but rather, have described its overall calming effect through the stimulation of areas within the reticular formation. The hallucinogenic or hypnotic properties have been described as being an additional effect from overall central nervous system suppression by other CNS agents, such as lithium or ethanol.

Hydroxyzine exhibits anxiolytic and sedative properties in many psychiatric patients. One study showed that patients reported very high levels of subjective sedation when first taking the drug, but that levels of reported sedation decreased markedly over 5–7 days, likely due to CNS receptor desensitization. Other studies have suggested that hydroxyzine acts as an acute hypnotic, reducing sleep onset latency and increasing sleep duration, also showing that some drowsiness did occur. This was observed more in female patients, who also had greater hypnotic responses. The use of sedating drugs alongside hydroxyzine can cause oversedation and confusion if administered at high doses—any form of hydroxyzine treatment alongside sedatives should be done under the supervision of a doctor.

Because of the potential for more severe side effects, this drug is on the list to avoid in older adults.

== Pharmacology ==
=== Pharmacodynamics ===
Hydroxyzine
Site	K_{i} (nM)	Species	Ref
5-HT_{2A}	170 (IC_{50})	Rat	
5-HT_{2C}	ND	ND	ND
α_{1}	460 (IC_{50})	Rat	
D_{1}	>10000	Mouse	
D_{2}	378; 560 (IC_{50})	Mouse; Rat	
H_{1}	2.0–19; 6.4; 100 (IC_{50})	Human; Bovine; Rat	
H_{2}	ND	ND	ND
H_{3}	ND	ND	ND
H_{4}	>10000	Human	
mACh	4600 >10000 >10000 (IC_{50}); 6310 (pA_{2}); 3800	Human; Mouse; Rat; Guinea pig Bovine	
VDCC	>3400 (IC_{50})	Rat	
Values are K_{i} (nM), unless otherwise noted. The smaller the value, the more strongly the drug binds to the site.

Hydroxyzine's predominant mechanism of action is as a potent and selective histamine H_{1} receptor inverse agonist. This action is responsible for its antihistamine and sedative effects. Unlike many other first-generation antihistamines, hydroxyzine has a lower affinity for the muscarinic acetylcholine receptors, and in accordance, has a lower risk of anticholinergic side effects. In addition to its antihistamine activity, hydroxyzine has also been shown to act more weakly as an antagonist of the serotonin 5-HT_{2A} receptor, the dopamine D_{2} receptor, and the α_{1}-adrenergic receptor. Similarly to the atypical antipsychotics, the comparably weak antiserotonergic effects of hydroxyzine likely underlie its usefulness as an anxiolytic. Other antihistamines without such properties have not been found to be effective in the treatment of anxiety.

Hydroxyzine crosses the blood–brain barrier easily and exerts effects in the central nervous system. A positron emission tomography (PET) study found that brain occupancy of the H_{1} receptor was 67.6% for a single 30 mg dose of hydroxyzine. In addition, subjective sleepiness correlated well with the brain H_{1} receptor occupancy. PET studies with antihistamines have found that brain H_{1} receptor occupancy of more than 50% is associated with a high prevalence of somnolence and cognitive decline, whereas brain H_{1} receptor occupancy of less than 20% is considered to be non-sedative.

Hydroxyzine also acts as a functional inhibitor of acid sphingomyelinase.

=== Pharmacokinetics ===
Hydroxyzine can be administered orally or via intramuscular injection. In both cases it is rapidly absorbed and distributed. It is metabolized in the liver and the main metabolite (45%), cetirizine is formed through oxidation of the alcohol moiety to a carboxylic acid by alcohol dehydrogenase. Overall effects are observed within one hour of administration. Higher concentrations are found in the skin than in the plasma. Cetirizine, although less sedating, is non-dialyzable and possesses similar antihistamine properties. Metabolites identified include an N-dealkylated metabolite and an O-dealkylated 1/16 metabolite with a plasma half-life of 59 hours. These pathways are mediated principally by CYP3A4 and CYP3A5. The N-dealykylated metabolite, norchlorcyclizine, bears some structural similarities to trazodone, but it has not been established whether it is pharmacologically active. In animals, hydroxyzine and its metabolites are excreted in feces primarily through biliary elimination. In rats, less than 2% of the drug is excreted unchanged.

The time to reach maximum concentration (T_{max}) of hydroxyzine is about 2.0 hours in both adults and children and its elimination half-life is around 20.0 hours in adults (mean age 29.3 years) and 7.1 hours in children. Its elimination half-life is shorter in children compared to adults. In another study, the elimination half-life of hydroxyzine in elderly adults was 29.3 hours. One study found that the elimination half-life of hydroxyzine in adults was as short as 3 hours, but this may have just been due to methodological limitations. Although hydroxyzine has a long elimination half-life and acts, in-vivo, as an antihistamine for as long as 24 hours, the predominant CNS effects of hydroxyzine and other antihistamines with long half-lives seem to diminish after 8 hours.

Administration in geriatrics differs from the administration of hydroxyzine in younger patients; according to the FDA, there have not been significant studies made (2004), which include population groups over 65, which provide a distinction between elderly aged patients and other younger groups. Hydroxyzine should be administered carefully in the elderly with consideration given to possible reduced elimination.

== Chemistry ==
Hydroxyzine is a member of the diphenylmethylpiperazine class of antihistamines.

Hydroxyzine is supplied mainly as a dihydrochloride salt (hydroxyzine hydrochloride) but also to a lesser extent as an embonate salt (hydroxyzine pamoate). The molecular weights of hydroxyzine, hydroxyzine dihydrochloride, and hydroxyzine pamoate are 374.9 g/mol, 447.8 g/mol, and 763.3 g/mol, respectively. Due to their differences in molecular weight, 1 mg hydroxyzine dihydrochloride is equivalent to about 1.7 mg hydroxyzine pamoate.

=== Analogues ===
Analogues of hydroxyzine include buclizine, cetirizine, cinnarizine, cyclizine, etodroxizine, meclizine, and pipoxizine among others.

== Society and culture ==
=== Brand names ===
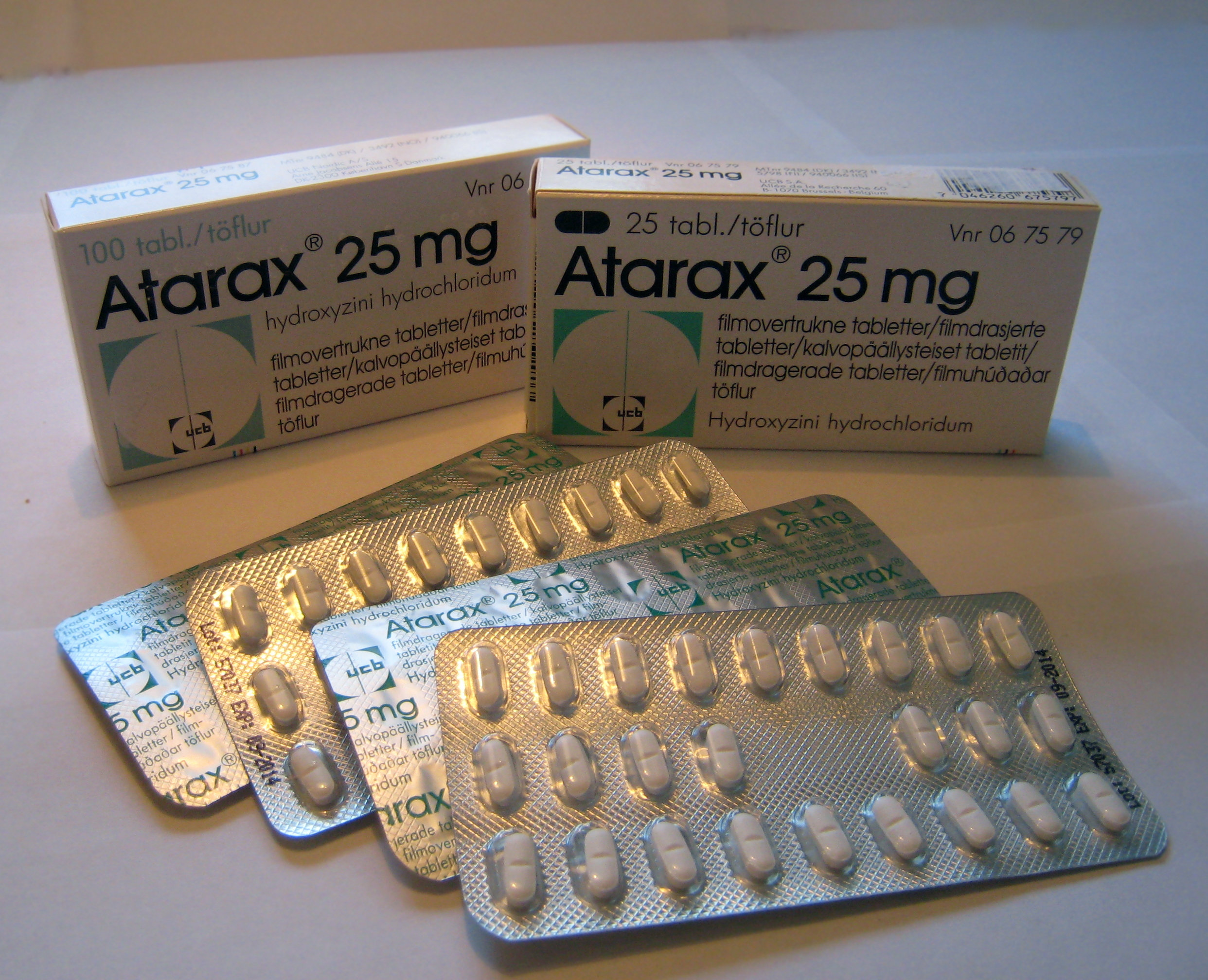
Atarax

Hydroxyzine preparations require a doctor's prescription. The drug is available in two formulations: the pamoate and the dihydrochloride or hydrochloride salts. Vistaril, Equipose, Masmoran, and Paxistil are preparations of the pamoate salt, while Atarax, Alamon, Aterax, Durrax, Tran-Q, Orgatrax, Quiess, and Tranquizine are of the hydrochloride salt.

== See also ==
- Gabasync
