= Etodroxizine =

Chemical compound

Clinical data
- ATC code: None

Legal status
- Legal status: BR: Class C1 (Other controlled substances)

Identifiers
- IUPAC name: 2-[2-(2-{4-[(4-Chlorophenyl)(phenyl)methyl]-1-piperazinyl}ethoxy)ethoxy]ethanol
- CAS Number: 17692-34-1
- PubChem CID: 63345
- ChemSpider: 57011
- UNII: CI1S3XAK7O
- ChEMBL: ChEMBL2104263
- CompTox Dashboard (EPA): DTXSID30864793

Chemical and physical data
- Formula: C_{23}H_{31}ClN_{2}O_{3}
- Molar mass: 418.96 g·mol^{−1}
- 3D model (JSmol): Interactive image
- SMILES: c1ccc(cc1)C(c2ccc(cc2)Cl)N3CCN(CC3)CCOCCOCCO
- InChI: InChI=1S/C23H31ClN2O3/c24-22-8-6-21(7-9-22)23(20-4-2-1-3-5-20)26-12-10-25(11-13-26)14-16-28-18-19-29-17-15-27/h1-9,23,27H,10-19H2; Key:VUFOCTSXHUWGPW-UHFFFAOYSA-N

Etodroxizine (INN; brand names Vesparax, Drimyl, Indunox, and Isonox) is a first-generation antihistamine of the diphenylmethylpiperazine group which is used as a sedative/hypnotic drug in Europe and South Africa.

== See also ==
- Hydroxyzine
- Pipoxizine
