= Chlorcyclizine =

Chemical compound

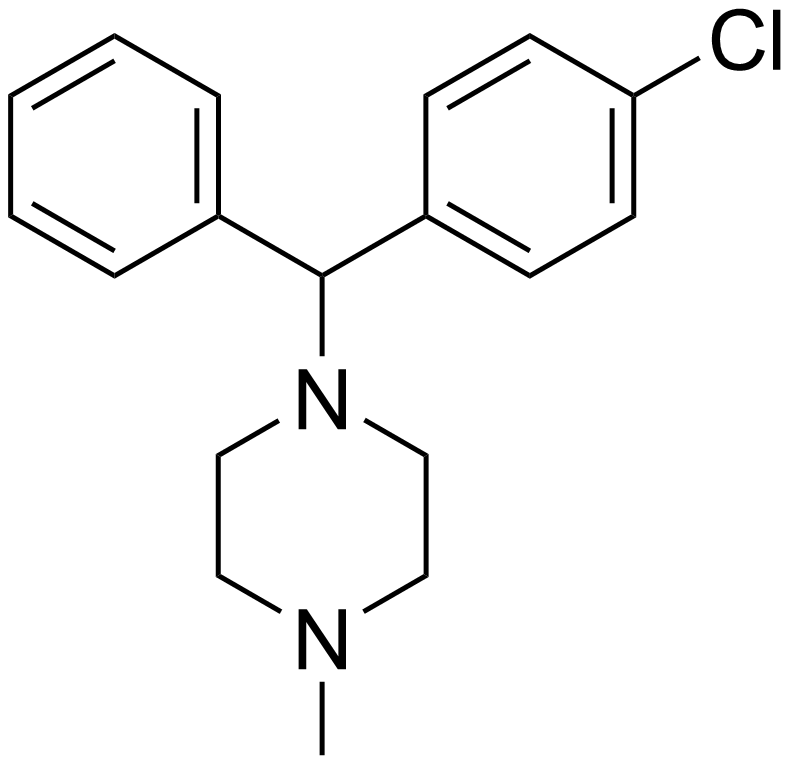

Clinical data
- AHFS/Drugs.com: International Drug Names
- MedlinePlus: a682619
- Routes of administration: Oral
- ATC code: R06AE04 (WHO)

Legal status
- Legal status: In general: ℞ (Prescription only)

Identifiers
- IUPAC name: 1-[(4-Chlorophenyl)(phenyl)methyl]-4-methylpiperazine
- CAS Number: 82-93-9
- PubChem CID: 2710
- ChemSpider: 2609
- UNII: M26C4IP44P
- ChEMBL: ChEMBL22150
- CompTox Dashboard (EPA): DTXSID9048011
- ECHA InfoCard: 100.001.315

Chemical and physical data
- Formula: C_{18}H_{21}ClN_{2}
- Molar mass: 300.83 g·mol^{−1}
- 3D model (JSmol): Interactive image
- SMILES: Clc1ccc(cc1)C(c2ccccc2)N3CCN(CC3)C
- InChI: InChI=1S/C18H21ClN2/c1-20-11-13-21(14-12-20)18(15-5-3-2-4-6-15)16-7-9-17(19)10-8-16/h2-10,18H,11-14H2,1H3; Key:WFNAKBGANONZEQ-UHFFFAOYSA-N

Chlorcyclizine (Di-Paralene, Mantadil, Pruresidine, Trihistan) is a first-generation antihistamine of the diphenylmethylpiperazine group marketed in the United States and certain other countries. It is used primarily to treat allergy symptoms such as rhinitis, urticaria, and pruritus, and may also be used as an antiemetic. In addition to its antihistamine effects, chlorcyclizine has some anticholinergic, antiserotonergic, and local anesthetic properties. It has been studied as a potential treatment for various flaviviruses like hepatitis C and Zika virus.

== See also ==
- Cyclizine
- Homochlorcyclizine
- Meclizine
