= C16H19N3S =

The molecular formula C_{16}H_{19}N_{3}S (molar mass: 285.41 g/mol, exact mass: 285.1300 u) may refer to:

- Isothipendyl
- Prothipendyl, also known as azaphenothiazine or phrenotropin
