= N-Methylpiperazine =

Names
- Preferred IUPAC name 1-Methylpiperazine
- Other names: 4-Methylpiperazine; p-Methylpiperazine

Identifiers
CAS Number	109-01-3
3D model (JSmol)	Interactive image
ChEMBL	ChEMBL1011
ChemSpider	48024
ECHA InfoCard	100.003.309
EC Number	203-639-5
PubChem CID	53167
UNII	B92I95EL9Q
UN number	2920
CompTox Dashboard (EPA)	DTXSID4021898
- InChI: InChI=1S/C5H12N2/c1-7-4-2-6-3-5-7/h6H,2-5H2,1H3 Key: PVOAHINGSUIXLS-UHFFFAOYSA-N
- SMILES: CN1CCNCC1

Properties
Chemical formula	C_{5}H_{12}N_{2}
Molar mass	100.165 g·mol^{−1}
Melting point	−6 °C (21 °F; 267 K)
Boiling point	138 °C (280 °F; 411 K)

Hazards
- GHS labelling
Pictograms	(GHS02: Flammable) (GHS05: Corrosive) (GHS06: Toxic) (GHS07: Exclamation mark)
Signal word	Danger
Hazard statements	H226, H312, H314, H317, H330, H331, H332
Precautionary statements	P210, P233, P240, P241, P242, P243, P260, P264, P271, P272, P280, P284, P301+P330+P331, P302+P352, P303+P361+P353, P304+P312, P304+P340, P305+P351+P338, P310, P311, P312, P320, P321, P333+P313, P363, P370+P378, P403+P233, P403+P235, P405, P501
NFPA 704 (fire diamond)	2 3 1
Safety data sheet (SDS)	FischerSci

Related compounds
Related compounds	Piperazine, 4-methylpyridine
- Except where otherwise noted, data are given for materials in their standard state (at 25 °C [77 °F], 100 kPa). Infobox references

N-Methylpiperazine is a heterocyclic organic compound.

== Uses ==
N-Methylpiperazine is a common building block used in organic synthesis. For example, N-methylpiperazine is used in the manufacture of various pharmaceutical drugs including cyclizine, meclizine, and sildenafil.

The lithium salt, lithium N-methylpiperazide, is used as a reagent in organic synthesis for protection of aryl aldehydes.

== Synthesis ==
Industrially, N-methylpiperazine is produced by reacting diethanolamine and methylamine at 250 bar and 200 °C.
