= 2-Aminothiophenol =

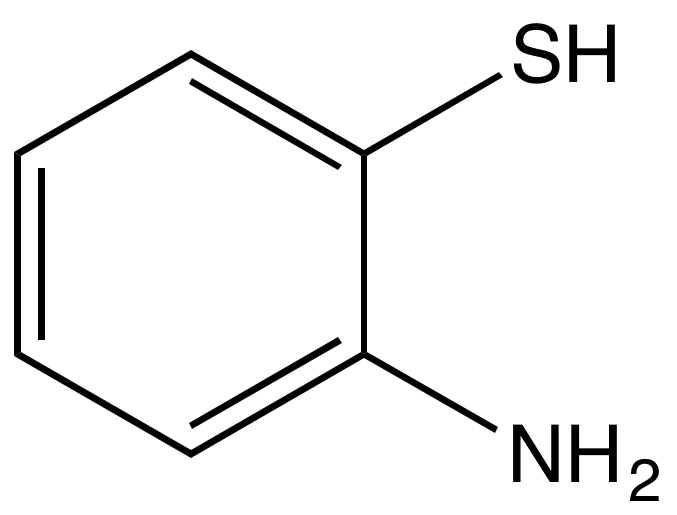

Names
- Preferred IUPAC name 2-Aminobenzene-1-thiol
- Other names: 2-Aminobenzenethiol; o-Amino-benzenethiol; 1-Amino-2-mercaptobenzene; 2-Amino-1-mercaptobenzene; 2-Mercaptoaniline; o-Aminobenzenethiol; o-Aminothiophenol; o-Mercaptoaniline

Identifiers
CAS Number	137-07-5
3D model (JSmol)	Interactive image
ChemSpider	21111815
ECHA InfoCard	100.004.798
EC Number	205-277-3
PubChem CID	8713
UNII	KIT82KOK2Z
CompTox Dashboard (EPA)	DTXSID6051693
- InChI: InChI=1S/C6H7NS/c7-5-3-1-2-4-6(5)8/h1-4,8H,7H2 Key: VRVRGVPWCUEOGV-UHFFFAOYSA-N; InChI=1/C6H7NS/c7-5-3-1-2-4-6(5)8/h1-4,8H,7H2 Key: VRVRGVPWCUEOGV-UHFFFAOYAG
- SMILES: c1ccc(c(c1)N)S

Properties
Chemical formula	C_{6}H_{7}NS
Molar mass	125.19 g·mol^{−1}
Appearance	Colorless (impure samples are colored)
Density	1.200 g/cm^{3}
Melting point	26 °C (79 °F; 299 K)
Boiling point	234 °C (453 °F; 507 K)
Solubility in water	low
- Except where otherwise noted, data are given for materials in their standard state (at 25 °C [77 °F], 100 kPa). Infobox references

2-Aminothiophenol is an organosulfur compound with the formula C_{6}H_{4}(SH)(NH_{2}). It is a colorless oily solid, although impure samples can be deeply colored. It is soluble in organic solvents and in basic water. 2-Aminothiophenol is a precursor to benzothiazoles, some of which are bioactive or are commercial dyes. Isomers of aminothiophenols include 3-aminothiophenol and 4-aminothiophenol.

2-Aminothiophenol can prepared in two steps, starting with the reaction of aniline with carbon disulfide followed by hydrolysis of the resulting mercaptobenzothiazole. It can also obtained by zinc reduction of 2-nitrobenzenesulfonyl chloride.

== Applications ==
2-Aminothiophenol is used in the synthesis of the following list of agents:

1. DDD-016
2. BTM 1086
3. Thioproperazine
4. Cinanserin
5. 1-Azaphenothiazine [261-96-1] (finds use in synthesis of Pipazethate, Prothipendyl, Cloxypendyl, Oxypendyl, & Isothipendyl).
