= Oxatomide =

Chemical compound

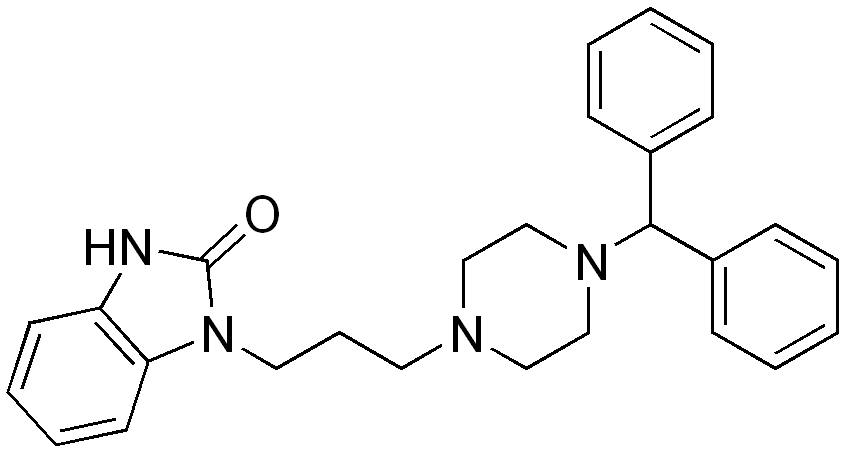

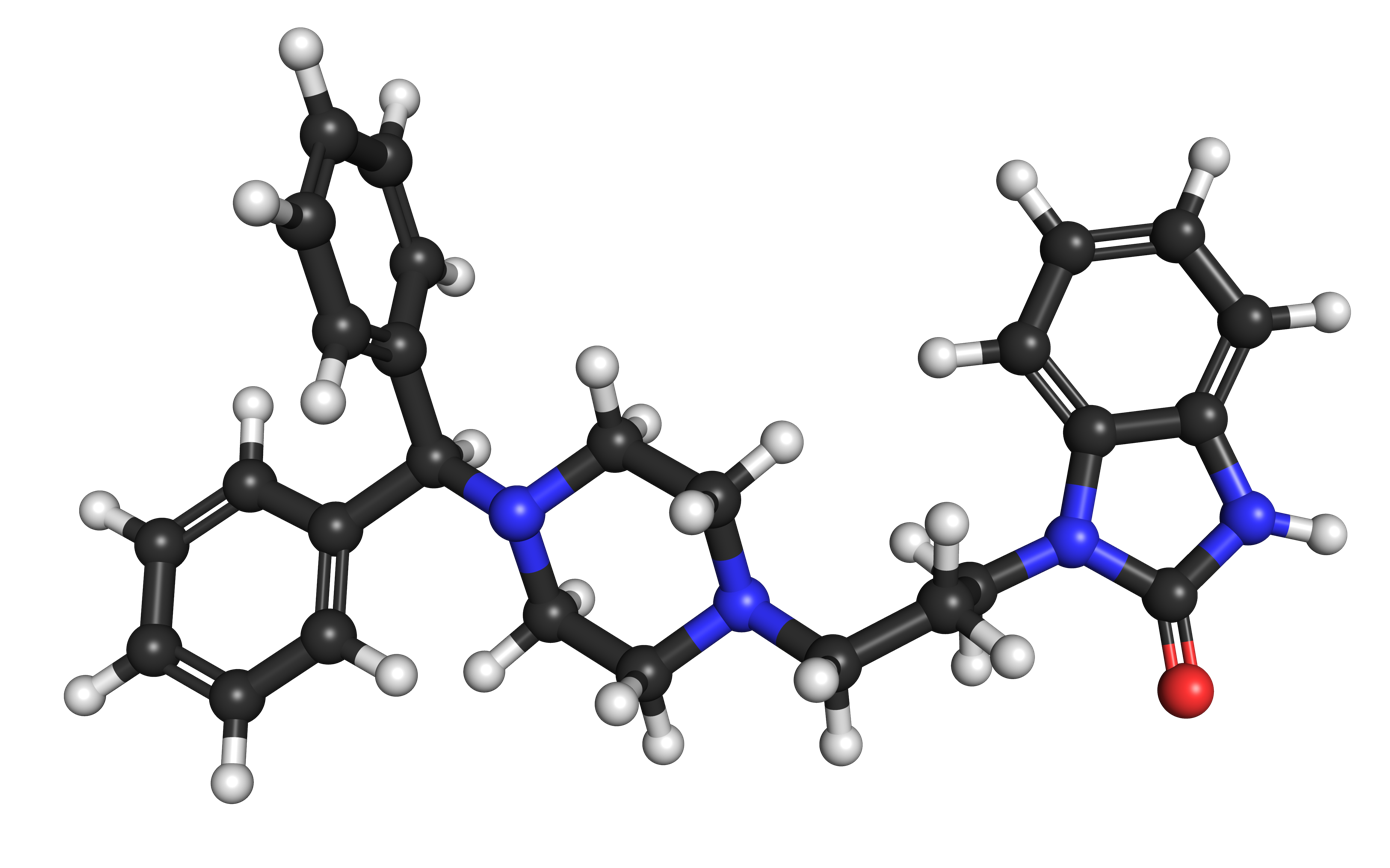
- Above: molecular structure of oxatomide Below: 3D representation of an oxatomide molecule

Clinical data
- Trade names: Tinset, others
- Other names: KW-4354; McN-JR 35443; R-35443
- AHFS/Drugs.com: International Drug Names
- Routes of administration: By mouth
- ATC code: R06AE06 (WHO)

Legal status
- Legal status: In general: ℞ (Prescription only)

Identifiers
- IUPAC name: 1-{3-[4-(diphenylmethyl)piperazin-1-yl]propyl}-1,3-dihydro-2H-benzimidazol-2-one
- CAS Number: 60607-34-3
- PubChem CID: 4615
- ChemSpider: 4454
- UNII: J31IL9Z2EE
- KEGG: D01773
- ChEBI: CHEBI:31943
- ChEMBL: ChEMBL13828
- CompTox Dashboard (EPA): DTXSID4045181
- ECHA InfoCard: 100.056.637

Chemical and physical data
- Formula: C_{27}H_{30}N_{4}O
- Molar mass: 426.564 g·mol^{−1}
- 3D model (JSmol): Interactive image
- SMILES: O=C2Nc1ccccc1N2CCCN5CCN(C(c3ccccc3)c4ccccc4)CC5
- InChI: InChI=1S/C27H30N4O/c32-27-28-24-14-7-8-15-25(24)31(27)17-9-16-29-18-20-30(21-19-29)26(22-10-3-1-4-11-22)23-12-5-2-6-13-23/h1-8,10-15,26H,9,16-21H2,(H,28,32); Key:BAINIUMDFURPJM-UHFFFAOYSA-N

Oxatomide, sold under the brand name Tinset among others, is a antihistamine of the diphenylmethylpiperazine family which is marketed in Europe, Japan, and a number of other countries. It was discovered at Janssen Pharmaceutica in 1975. Oxatomide lacks any anticholinergic effects. In addition to its H_{1} receptor antagonism, it also possesses antiserotonergic activity similarly to hydroxyzine. Oxatomide was also found to have antiviral activity against Venezuelan equine encephalitis virus (VEEV).

It was patented in 1976 and came into medical use in 1981.

== Chemistry ==
=== Synthesis ===
Oxatomide synthesis:

Reaction of 2-Benzimidazolinone with isopropenyl acetate leads to the singly protected imidazolone derivative (2). Alkylation of this with 3-chloro-1-bromopropane affords the functionalized derivative (3). Alkylation of the monobenzhydryl derivative of piperazine (4) with 3 gives oxatomide (5), after hydrolytic removal of the protecting group.
