= C19H21N3O =

The molecular formula C_{19}H_{21}N_{3}O (molar mass: 307.39 g/mol, exact mass: 307.1685 u) may refer to:

- Alcaftadine
- Talastine
- Zolpidem
