= C19H23ClN2 =

The molecular formula C_{19}H_{23}ClN_{2} (molar mass: 314.85 g/mol, exact mass: 314.1550 u) may refer to:

- Clomipramine
- Homochlorcyclizine
