= R06 =

R06 may refer to:

- HMS Illustrious (R06)
- ATC code R06
- HMS Centaur (R06)
