= Aminothiophenol =

Aminothiophenol may refer to:

- 2-Aminothiophenol
- 3-Aminothiophenol
- 4-Aminothiophenol
