= C18H22ClNO =

The molecular formula C_{18}H_{22}ClNO (molar mass: 303.83 g/mol, exact mass: 303.1390 u) may refer to:

- Chlorphenoxamine (Phenoxene)
- Phenoxybenzamine (PBZ)
