= Cinnarizine/dimenhydrinate =

Combination drug

Combination of
- Cinnarizine: Antihistamine and calcium channel blocker
- Dimenhydrinate: Antihistamine and antiemetic

Clinical data
- Trade names: Cizigo, Cizinate, Cizere
- Pregnancy category: AU: B2
- Routes of administration: By mouth
- ATC code: N07CA52 (WHO)

Legal status
- Legal status: AU: S4 (Prescription only)

Identifiers
- CAS Number: 298-57-7; 523-87-5
- UNII: 3DI2E1X18L; JB937PER5C

Cinnarizine/dimenhydrinate, sold under the brand name Cizinate among others is a fixed-dose combination medication for the treatment of vertigo in adults. It contains cinnarizine and dimenhydrinate. It is taken by mouth.

It was approved for medical use in Australia in December 2018.
