= Isoquinoline 1-oxidoreductase =

isoquinoline 1-oxidoreductase

Identifiers
- EC no.: 1.3.99.16
- CAS no.: 155948-73-5

Databases
- IntEnz: IntEnz view
- BRENDA: BRENDA entry
- ExPASy: NiceZyme view
- KEGG: KEGG entry
- MetaCyc: metabolic pathway
- PRIAM: profile
- PDB structures: RCSB PDB PDBe PDBsum
- Gene Ontology: AmiGO / QuickGO
Search
- PMC: articles
- PubMed: articles
- NCBI: proteins

In enzymology, isoquinoline 1-oxidoreductase (EC 1.3.99.16) is an enzyme that catalyzes the chemical reaction

isoquinoline
+ electron acceptor
H_{2}O
H_{2}O
isocarbostyril
+ reduced acceptor

The three substrates of this enzyme are isoquinoline, an electron acceptor, and water. Its products are isocarbostyril and reduced acceptor.

This enzyme belongs to the family of oxidoreductases, specifically those acting on the CH-CH group of donor with other acceptors. The systematic name of this enzyme class is isoquinoline:acceptor 1-oxidoreductase (hydroxylating).
