= Methapyrilene =

Chemical compound

Clinical data
- ATC code: R06AC05 (WHO)

Identifiers
- IUPAC name: N,N-dimethyl-N'-pyridin-2-yl-N'-(2-thienylmethyl)ethane-1,2-diamine
- CAS Number: 91-80-5
- PubChem CID: 4098
- DrugBank: DB04819
- ChemSpider: 3956
- UNII: A01LX40298
- KEGG: C11114
- ChEBI: CHEBI:6820
- CompTox Dashboard (EPA): DTXSID2023278

Chemical and physical data
- Formula: C_{14}H_{19}N_{3}S
- Molar mass: 261.39 g·mol^{−1}
- 3D model (JSmol): Interactive image
- SMILES: n1ccccc1N(CCN(C)C)Cc2sccc2
- InChI: InChI=1S/C14H19N3S/c1-16(2)9-10-17(12-13-6-5-11-18-13)14-7-3-4-8-15-14/h3-8,11H,9-10,12H2,1-2H3; Key:HNJJXZKZRAWDPF-UHFFFAOYSA-N

Methapyrilene is an antihistamine and anticholinergic of the pyridine chemical class which was developed in the early 1950s. It was sold under the trade names Co-Pyronil and Histadyl EC in the UK. It has relatively strong sedative effects, to the extent that its primary use was as a medication for insomnia rather than for its antihistamine action. Together with scopolamine, it was the main ingredient in Sominex, Nytol, and Sleep-Eze. It also provided the sedative component of Excedrin PM. All of these products were reformulated in the late 1970s when methapyrilene was demonstrated to cause liver cancer in rats when given chronically.

== See also ==
- Thenalidine
- Methaphenilene
