= Pomeranz–Fritsch reaction =

Chemical reaction

Named after	Cäsar Pomeranz; Paul Fritsch
Reaction type	Ring forming reaction

The Pomeranz–Fritsch reaction, also named Pomeranz–Fritsch cyclization, is a named reaction in organic chemistry. It is named after Paul Fritsch (1859–1913) and Cäsar Pomeranz (1860–1926). In general it is a synthesis of isoquinoline.

== General reaction scheme ==
The reaction below shows the acid-promoted synthesis of isoquinoline from benzaldehyde and a 2,2-dialkoxyethylamine.

Pomeranz-Fritsch-Reaktion-Übersichtsreaktion

Various alkyl groups, e.g. methyl and ethyl groups, can be used as substituent R.

In the archetypical reaction sulfuric acid was used as proton donor, but Lewis acids such as trifluoroacetic anhydride and lanthanide triflates have been used occasionally. Later, a wide range of diverse isoquinolines were successfully prepared.

== Reaction mechanism ==
A possible mechanism is depicted below:

proposed mechanism Pomeranz-Fritsch reaction

First the benzalaminoacetal 1 is built by the condensation of benzaldehyde and a 2,2-dialkoxyethylamine. After the condensation a hydrogen-atom is added to one of the alkoxy groups. Subsequently, an alcohol is removed. Next, the compound 2 is built. After that a second hydrogen-atom is added to the compound. In the last step a second alcohol is removed and the bicyclic system becomes aromatic.

== Applications ==
The Pomeranz–Fritsch reaction has general application in the preparation of isoquinoline derivatives.
Isoquinolines find many applications, including:

- topical anesthetics such as dimethisoquin:

- vasodilators, a well-known example, papaverine, shown below.

== See also ==
- Bischler–Napieralski reaction
- Pictet–Spengler reaction
