= Cyclizine =

Medication for motion sickness or vertigo

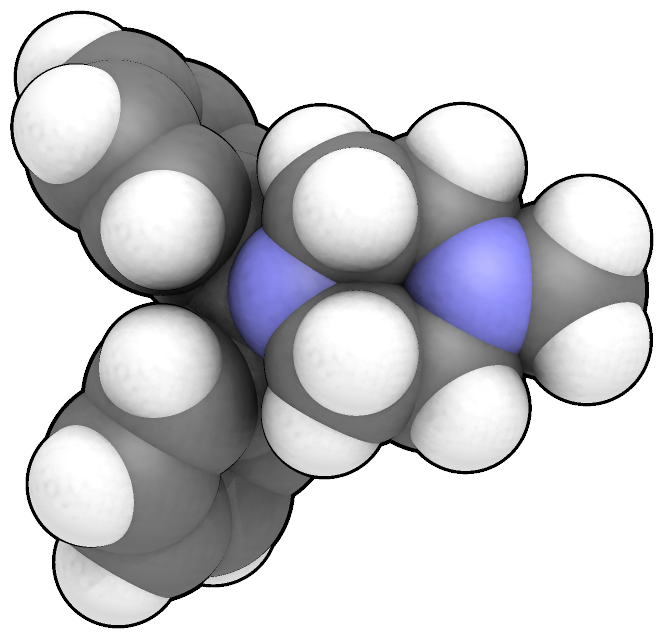

Clinical data
- Trade names: Marezine, Valoid, Nausicalm, others
- AHFS/Drugs.com: Consumer Drug Information
- Pregnancy category: AU: A
- Routes of administration: By mouth, IM, IV
- ATC code: R06AE03 (WHO)

Legal status
- Legal status: AU: S3 (Pharmacist only); UK: P (Pharmacy medicines); US: OTC; OTC (Netherlands)

Pharmacokinetic data
- Metabolism: N-demethylated to inactive norcyclizine
- Elimination half-life: 20 hours

Identifiers
- IUPAC name: 1-benzhydryl-4-methyl-piperazine
- CAS Number: 82-92-8
- PubChem CID: 6726
- IUPHAR/BPS: 7151
- DrugBank: DB01176
- ChemSpider: 6470
- UNII: QRW9FCR9P2
- KEGG: D03621
- ChEBI: CHEBI:3994
- ChEMBL: ChEMBL648
- CompTox Dashboard (EPA): DTXSID4022864
- ECHA InfoCard: 100.001.314

Chemical and physical data
- Formula: C_{18}H_{22}N_{2}
- Molar mass: 266.388 g·mol^{−1}
- 3D model (JSmol): Interactive image
- SMILES: CN(CC1)CCN1C(C2=CC=CC=C2)C3=CC=CC=C3
- InChI: InChI=1S/C18H22N2/c1-19-12-14-20(15-13-19)18(16-8-4-2-5-9-16)17-10-6-3-7-11-17/h2-11,18H,12-15H2,1H3; Key:UVKZSORBKUEBAZ-UHFFFAOYSA-N

Cyclizine, sold under a number of brand names, is a medication used to treat and prevent nausea, vomiting and dizziness due to motion sickness or vertigo. It may also be used for nausea after general anaesthesia or that which developed from opioid use. It is taken by mouth, in the rectum, or injected into a vein.

Common side effects include sleepiness, dry mouth, constipation, and trouble with vision. More serious side effects include low blood pressure and urinary retention. It is not generally recommended in young children or those with glaucoma. Cyclizine appears to be safe during pregnancy but has not been well studied. It is in the anticholinergic and antihistamine family of medications.

Cyclizine was discovered in 1947. It is on the World Health Organization's List of Essential Medicines. In the United States it is available over the counter.

== Medical uses ==
Primary uses include nausea, vomiting and dizziness associated with motion sickness, vertigo and post-operatively following administration of general anesthesia and opioids. It is sometimes given in hyperemesis gravidarum, although the manufacturer advises that it be avoided in pregnancy. Off-license use often occurs with specialists in hospitals to treat inpatients who have become severely dehydrated in pregnancy. An off-label use is as an opioid/opiate potentiator.

The drug Diconal is a combination of cyclizine and the opioid dipipanone. Dipipanone is a schedule I controlled substance in the US.

== Contraindications ==
Its antimuscarinic action warrants caution in patients with prostatic hypertrophy, urinary retention, or angle-closure glaucoma. Liver disease exacerbates its sedative effects.

== Adverse effects ==
Common (over 10%) — Drowsiness, dry mouth.

Uncommon (1% to 10%) — Headache, psychomotor impairment, dermatitis, and antimuscarinic effects such as diplopia (double vision), tachycardia, constipation, urinary retention and gastro-intestinal disturbances.

Rare (less than 1%) — Hypersensitivity reactions (bronchospasm, angioedema, anaphylaxis, rashes and photosensitivity reactions), extrapyramidal effects, dizziness, confusion, depression, sleep disturbances, tremor, liver dysfunction, and hallucinations.

== Pharmacology ==
Cyclizine is a piperazine derivative with histamine H_{1}-receptor antagonist (antihistamine) activity. The precise mechanism of action in inhibiting the symptoms of motion sickness is not well understood. It may have effects directly on the vestibular system and on the chemoreceptor trigger zone. Cyclizine exerts a central anticholinergic (antimuscarinic) action.

== Synthesis ==
Cyclizine may be prepared by the Eschweiler–Clarke methylation of diphenylmethylpiperazine or by reaction of benzhydryl bromide with 1-methylpiperazine in acetonitrile to form the hydrobromide salt of the drug.

== History ==
Cyclizine was developed in the American division of pharmacy company Burroughs Wellcome (today GlaxoSmithKline) during a research study involving many drugs of the antihistamine group. Cyclizine was quickly clinically found as a potent and long-acting antiemetic. The company named the substance – or more precisely cyclizine's hydrochloride form which it usually appears in – "marezine hydrochloride" and started to sell it in the United States under trade name Marezine. Selling was begun in France under trade name Marzine in 1965.

The substance received more credit when NASA chose it as a space antiemetic for the first crewed Moon flight. Cyclizine was introduced to many countries as a common antiemetic. It is an over-the-counter drug in many countries because it has been well tolerated, although it has not been studied much.

== Society and culture ==
Some people using methadone recreationally combine cyclizine with their methadone dose, a combination that is known to produce strong psychoactive effects. It has also been used recreationally for its anticholinergic effects to induce hallucinations.

It has been used illegally in greyhound racing to sabotage a dog's performance.

=== Names ===
As cyclizine hydrochloride tablets and cyclizine lactate solution for intramuscular or intravenous injection (brand names: Valoid in UK and South Africa and Marezine, Marzine and Emoquil in US). Cyclizine was marketed as Bonine for Kids in the US, but was discontinued in 2012, and replaced with meclizine.

== Cyclizine derivatives ==
Structural comparison of cyclizine and related H_{1} antagonists
Compound	R^{1}	R^{2}
Cyclizine	H	CH_{3}
Chlorcyclizine	Cl	CH_{3}
Meclizine	Cl	
Buclizine	Cl	
Oxatomide	H	
Hydroxyzine	Cl	
Cetirizine	Cl	

== See also ==
- Cinnarizine
