= Morphine/cyclizine =

Combination of morphine and cylclizine

Combination of
- Morphine: Opioid
- Cyclizine: Antiemetic

Clinical data
- Trade names: Cyclimorph

Legal status
- Legal status: Rx in UK and Ireland

Morphine/cyclizine (brand name Cyclimorph) is a morphine combination drug - in this case with cyclizine. The brand is sold in the UK and Ireland. The UK MHRA identifiers are 38847 and 38852. The Irish HPRA identifier is 19305.
