= C24H31NO3 =

The molecular formula C_{24}H_{31}NO_{3} (molar mass: 381.51 g/mol, exact mass: 381.2304 u) may refer to:

- Ansofaxine, or 4-methylbenzoate desvenlafaxine
- Pipoxizine
