= C20H23NO =

The molecular formula C_{20}H_{23}NO (molar mass: 293.40 g/mol, exact mass: 293.1780 u) may refer to:

- Amitriptylinoxide, or amitriptyline N-oxide
- Oxaprotiline, or hydroxymaprotiline
- Quifenadine
