= Methaphenilene =

Chemical compound

Identifiers
- IUPAC name: N,N-Dimethyl-N′-phenyl-N′-(thiophen-2-ylmethyl)ethane-1,2-diamine
- CAS Number: 493-78-7
- ChemSpider: 9884
- UNII: Q1MP2MRW1E
- CompTox Dashboard (EPA): DTXSID5020817
- ECHA InfoCard: 100.007.074

Chemical and physical data
- Formula: C_{15}H_{20}N_{2}S
- Molar mass: 260.40 g·mol^{−1}
- 3D model (JSmol): Interactive image
- SMILES: CN(C)CCN(Cc1cccs1)c2ccccc2
- InChI: InChI=InChI=1S/C15H20N2S/c1-16(2)10-11-17(13-15-9-6-12-18-15)14-7-4-3-5-8-14/h3-9,12H,10-11,13H2,1-2H3; Key:LDYJXVUOVPVZKA-UHFFFAOYSA-N

Methaphenilene is an antihistamine and anticholinergic.

== Synthesis ==
Methaphenilene can be synthesized from N,N-dimethyl-N′-phenylethane-1,2-diamine by alkylation with 2-(chloromethyl)thiophene.

Methaphenilene synthesis

== See also ==
- Thenalidine
- Methapyrilene
