= Isoquinoline =

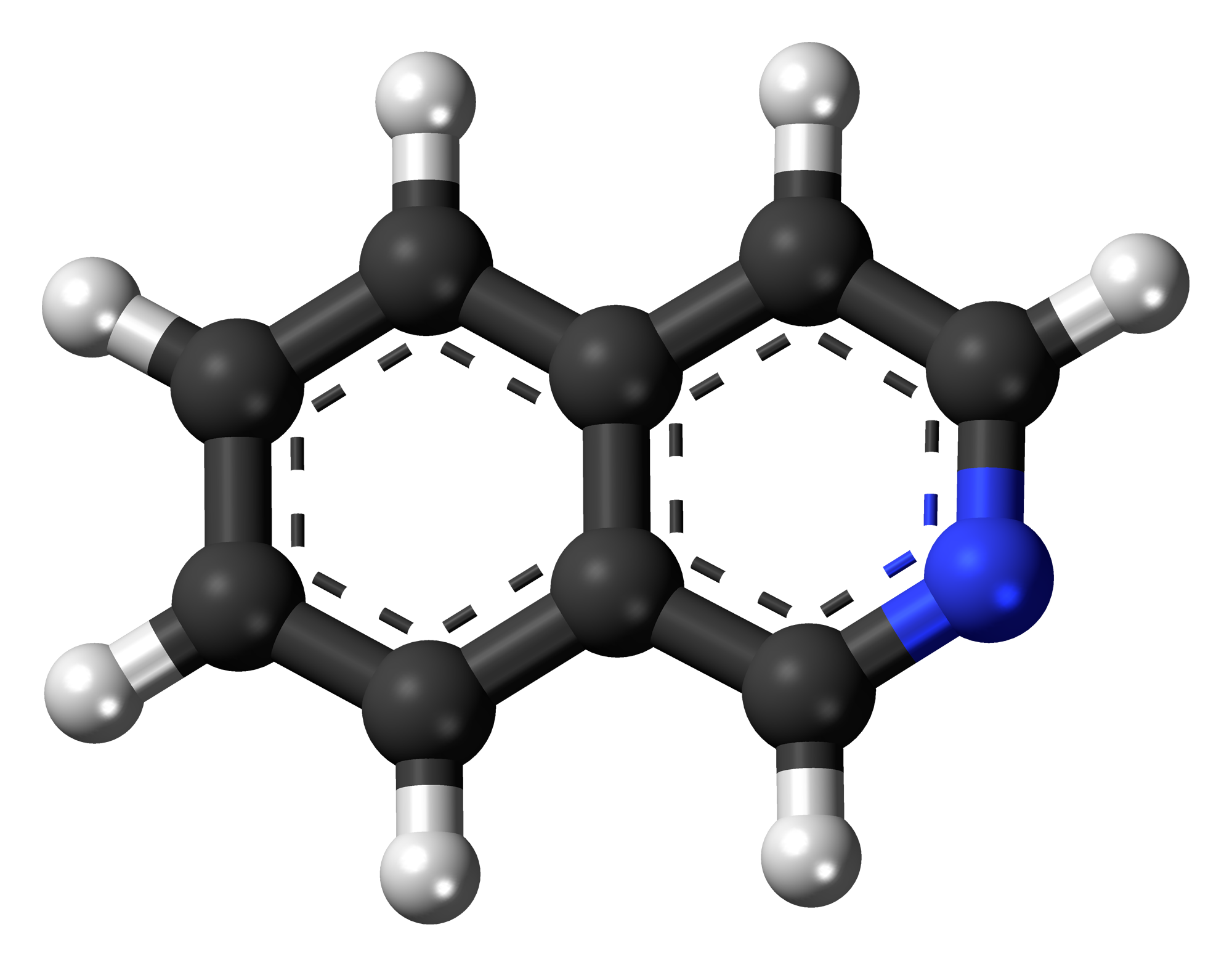
C=black, H=white, N=blue
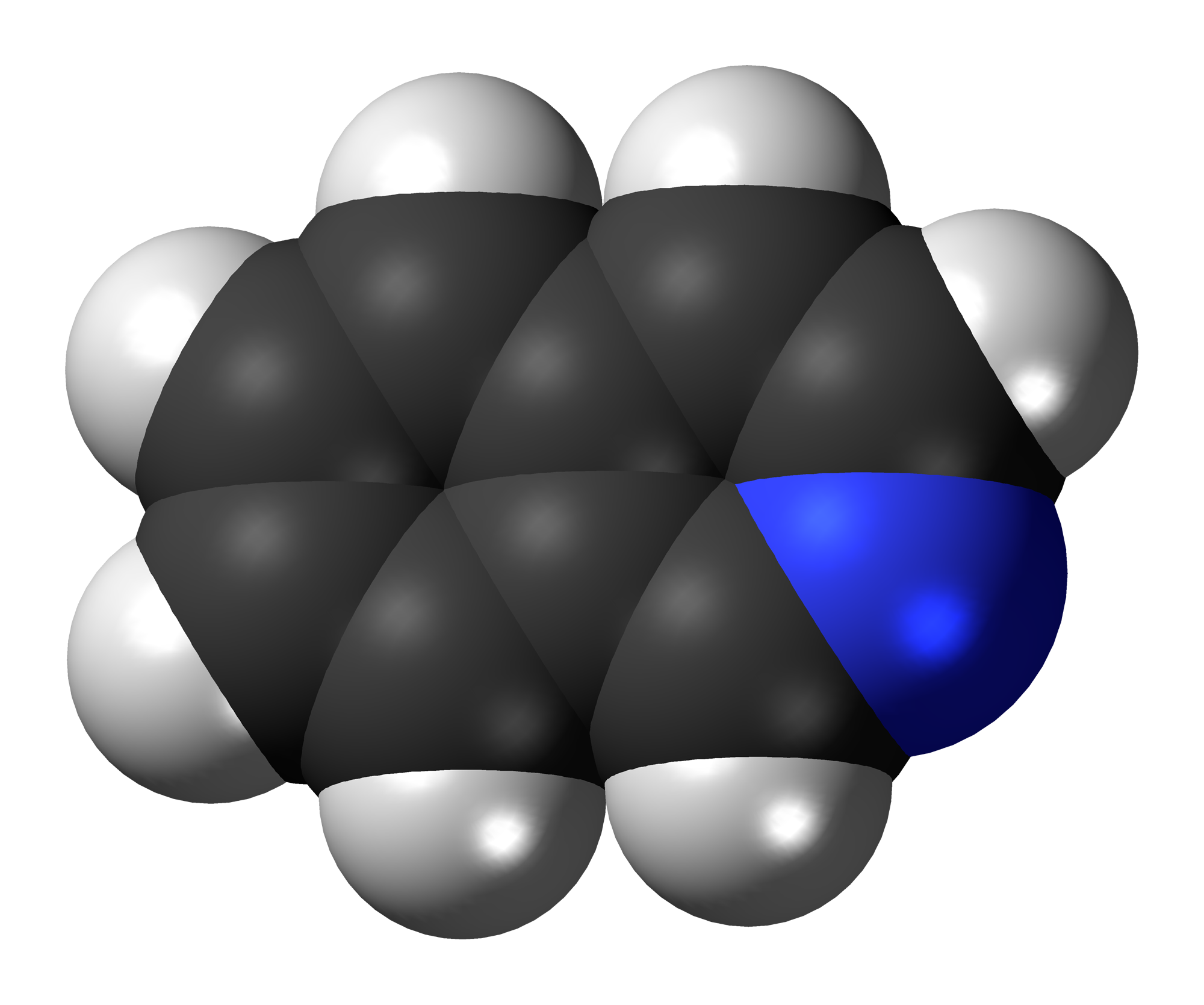
C=black, H=white, N=blue

Names
- Preferred IUPAC name Isoquinoline
- Other names Benzo[c]pyridine; 2-benzazine

Identifiers
CAS Number	119-65-3
3D model (JSmol)	Interactive image
ChEBI	CHEBI:16092
ChEMBL	ChEMBL12315
ChemSpider	8098
DrugBank	DB04329
ECHA InfoCard	100.003.947
EC Number	204-341-8
PubChem CID	8405
UNII	JGX76Y85M6
CompTox Dashboard (EPA)	DTXSID2047644
- InChI: InChI=1S/C9H7N/c1-2-4-9-7-10-6-5-8(9)3-1/h1-7H Key: AWJUIBRHMBBTKR-UHFFFAOYSA-N; InChI=1/C9H7N/c1-2-4-9-7-10-6-5-8(9)3-1/h1-7H Key: AWJUIBRHMBBTKR-UHFFFAOYAX
- SMILES: C1(C=NC=C2)=C2C=CC=C1

Properties
Chemical formula	C_{9}H_{7}N
Molar mass	129.162 g·mol^{−1}
Appearance	Colorless oily liquid; hygroscopic platelets when solid
Density	1.099 g/cm^{3}
Melting point	26–28 °C (79–82 °F; 299–301 K)
Boiling point	242 °C (468 °F; 515 K)
Acidity (pK_{a})	pK_{BH^{+}} = 5.14
Magnetic susceptibility (χ)	−83.9·10^{−6} cm^{3}/mol
- Except where otherwise noted, data are given for materials in their standard state (at 25 °C [77 °F], 100 kPa). verify (what is ?) Infobox references

Isoquinoline is an individual chemical specimen—a heterocyclic aromatic organic compound—as well as the name of a family of many thousands of natural plant alkaloids, any one of which might be referred to as "an isoquinoline" or isoquinolines. It is a structural isomer of quinoline. Isoquinoline and quinoline are benzopyridines, which are composed of a benzene ring fused to a pyridine ring. In a broader sense, the term isoquinoline is used to make reference to isoquinoline derivatives. 1-Benzylisoquinoline is the structural backbone in many naturally occurring alkaloids such as papaverine. The isoquinoline ring in these natural compound derives from the aromatic amino acid tyrosine.

== Properties ==
Isoquinoline is a colorless hygroscopic liquid at temperatures above its melting point with a penetrating, unpleasant odor. Impure samples can appear brownish, as is typical for nitrogen heterocycles. It crystallizes in form of platelets that have a low solubility in water but dissolve well in common organic solvents. It is also soluble in dilute acids as the protonated derivative.

Being an analog of pyridine, isoquinoline is a weak base, with a pK_{a} of 5.14. It protonates to form salts upon treatment with strong acids, such as HCl. It forms adducts with Lewis acids, such as BF_{3}.

== Production ==
Isoquinoline was first isolated from coal tar in 1885 by Hoogewerf and van Dorp. They isolated it by fractional crystallization of the acid sulfate. Weissgerber developed a more rapid route in 1914 by selective extraction of coal tar, exploiting the fact that isoquinoline is more basic than quinoline. Isoquinoline can then be isolated from the mixture by fractional crystallization of the acid sulfate.

Although isoquinoline derivatives can be synthesized by several methods, relatively few direct methods deliver the unsubstituted isoquinoline. The Pomeranz–Fritsch reaction provides an efficient method for the preparation of isoquinoline. This reaction uses a benzaldehyde and aminoacetoaldehyde diethyl acetal, which in an acid medium react to form isoquinoline. Alternatively, benzylamine and a glyoxal acetal can be used, to produce the same result using the Schlittler-Müller modification.

Several other methods are useful for the preparation of various isoquinoline derivatives.

In the Bischler–Napieralski reaction an β-phenylethylamine is acylated and cyclodehydrated by a Lewis acid, such as phosphoryl chloride or phosphorus pentoxide. The resulting 1-substituted 3,4-dihydroisoquinoline can then be dehydrogenated using palladium. The following Bischler–Napieralski reaction produces papaverine.

The Pictet–Gams reaction and the Pictet–Spengler reaction are both variations on the Bischler–Napieralski reaction. A Pictet–Gams reaction works similarly to the Bischler–Napieralski reaction; the only difference being that an additional hydroxy group in the reactant provides a site for dehydration under the same reaction conditions as the cyclization to give the isoquinoline rather than requiring a separate reaction to convert a dihydroisoquinoline intermediate.

In a Pictet–Spengler reaction, a condensation of a β-phenylethylamine and an aldehyde forms an imine, which undergoes a cyclization to form a tetrahydroisoquinoline instead of the dihydroisoquinoline. In enzymology, the (S)-norcoclaurine synthase (EC 4.2.1.78) is an enzyme that catalyzes a biological Pictect-Spengler synthesis:

1,2,3,4-Tetrahidroisoquinolines biosynthesis: in (S)-norcoclaurine synthase, the two substrates are 4-hydroxyphenylacetaldehyde and 4-(2-aminoethyl)benzene-1,2-diol, whereas its two products are (S)-norcoclaurine and H_{2}O.

Intramolecular aza Wittig reactions also afford isoquinolines.

== Applications of derivatives ==
Isoquinolines find applications in medicinal chemistry.

Isoquinolines and tetrahydroisoquinolines of medicinal interest
Quinisocaine, anesthetic

Saquinavir, vasodilator

Papaverine, antispasmodic

Praziquantel, antiparasitic

Other:

- anesthetics; dimethisoquin is one example (shown below).
- antihypertension agents, such as quinapril and debrisoquine (all derived from 1,2,3,4-tetrahydroisoquinoline).
- antiretroviral agents, such as saquinavir with an isoquinolyl functional group, (shown below).

== In the human body ==
Parkinson's disease, a slowly progressing movement disorder, is thought to be caused by certain neurotoxins. A neurotoxin called MPTP (1[N]-methyl-4-phenyl-1,2,3,6-tetrahydropyridine), the precursor to MPP^{+}, was found and linked to Parkinson's disease in the 1980s. The active neurotoxins destroy dopaminergic neurons, leading to parkinsonism and Parkinson's disease. Several tetrahydroisoquinoline derivatives have been found to have the same neurochemical properties as MPTP. These derivatives may act as precursors to active neurotoxins.

== Other uses ==
Isoquinolines are used in the manufacture of dyes, paints, insecticides and fungicides. It is also used as a solvent for the liquid–liquid extraction of resins and terpenes, and as a corrosion inhibitor.

== See also ==
- Eletefine (1998), an isoquinoline alkaloid
- Naphthalene, an analog without the nitrogen atom
- Substituted tetrahydroisoquinoline
