= Pyrrobutamine =

Chemical compound

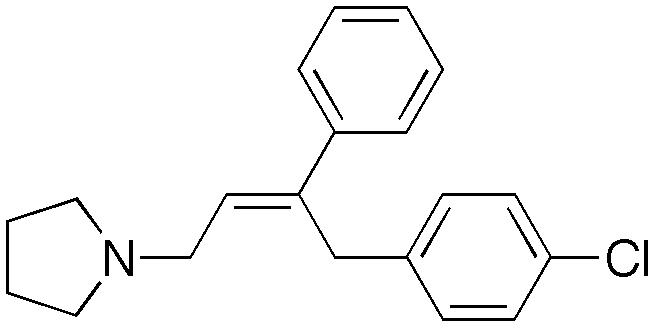

Clinical data
- ATC code: R06AX08 (WHO)

Identifiers
- IUPAC name: 1-[(2E)-4-(4-chlorophenyl)-3-phenylbut-2-en-1-yl]pyrrolidine
- CAS Number: 91-82-7
- PubChem CID: 5284614
- ChemSpider: 4447659
- UNII: VE6KP18S8X
- ChEMBL: ChEMBL1697849
- CompTox Dashboard (EPA): DTXSID9023544
- ECHA InfoCard: 100.001.911

Chemical and physical data
- Formula: C_{20}H_{22}ClN
- Molar mass: 311.85 g·mol^{−1}
- 3D model (JSmol): Interactive image
- SMILES: C1CCN(C1)C/C=C(\CC2=CC=C(C=C2)Cl)/C3=CC=CC=C3
- InChI: InChI=1S/C20H22ClN/c21-20-10-8-17(9-11-20)16-19(18-6-2-1-3-7-18)12-15-22-13-4-5-14-22/h1-3,6-12H,4-5,13-16H2/b19-12+; Key:WDYYVNNRTDZKAZ-XDHOZWIPSA-N

Pyrrobutamine is an antihistamine and anticholinergic.
