= Mequitazine =

Chemical compound

Clinical data
- Trade names: Primalan
- AHFS/Drugs.com: International Drug Names
- ATC code: R06AD07 (WHO)

Legal status
- Legal status: EU: Rx-only

Identifiers
- IUPAC name: 10-(1-Azabicyclo[2.2.2]octan-3-ylmethyl)phenothiazine
- CAS Number: 29216-28-2
- PubChem CID: 4066
- DrugBank: DB01071
- ChemSpider: 3926
- UNII: Y463242LY2
- KEGG: D01324
- CompTox Dashboard (EPA): DTXSID8023262
- ECHA InfoCard: 100.045.005

Chemical and physical data
- Formula: C_{20}H_{22}N_{2}S
- Molar mass: 322.47 g·mol^{−1}
- 3D model (JSmol): Interactive image
- SMILES: c1ccc2c(c1)Sc1ccccc1N2CC1CN2CCC1CC2
- InChI: InChI=1S/C20H22N2S/c1-3-7-19-17(5-1)22(18-6-2-4-8-20(18)23-19)14-16-13-21-11-9-15(16)10-12-21/h1-8,15-16H,9-14H2; Key:HOKDBMAJZXIPGC-UHFFFAOYSA-N

Mequitazine (trade name Primalan) is an H_{1} antagonist and anticholinergic of the phenothiazine chemical class. It is used to treat allergies and rhinitis.

It was patented in 1969 and came into medical use in 1976.

== Contraindications ==
Severe liver disease; premature infants or full-term neonates.

== Special precautions ==
Pregnancy, lactation; severe cardiovascular disorders; asthma; angle-closure glaucoma, urinary retention, prostatic hyperplasia, pyloroduodenal obstruction; renal and hepatic impairment; elderly, children; epilepsy. May impair ability to drive or operate machinery.

== Adverse reactions ==
CNS depression including slight drowsiness to deep sleep, lassitude, dizziness, incoordination. Headache, psychomotor impairment and antimuscarinic effects. Rarely, rashes and hypersensitivity reactions, blood disorders, convulsions, sweating, myalgia, paraesthesias, extrapyramidal effects, tremor, confusion, sleep and GI disturbances, tinnitus, hypotension, hair loss. Photosensitivity, jaundice.

== Drug interactions ==
Enhances effects of CNS depressants e.g. alcohol, barbiturates, hypnotics, opioid analgesics, anxiolytics and antipsychotics. Can mask signs of ototoxicity caused by aminoglycosides. QT prolongation (which can lead to torsades de pointes arrhythmia) reported with spiramycin.

== Synthesis ==
Same precursor as for Quifenadine. Note that the synthesis has changed over the years from the original. One route seems to involve a Johnson–Corey–Chaykovsky reaction of the starting ketone, although another secondary route is also discussed.

Thieme Prec: Synthesis:
