= Tolpropamine =

Chemical compound

Clinical data
- ATC code: D04AA12 (WHO)

Identifiers
- IUPAC name: N,N-dimethyl-3-(4-methylphenyl)-3-phenylpropan-1-amine
- CAS Number: 5632-44-0 3354-67-4
- PubChem CID: 72141
- ChemSpider: 65115
- UNII: TBZ8909KFS
- KEGG: D07196
- CompTox Dashboard (EPA): DTXSID30863584
- ECHA InfoCard: 100.024.611

Chemical and physical data
- Formula: C_{18}H_{23}N
- Molar mass: 253.389 g·mol^{−1}
- 3D model (JSmol): Interactive image
- SMILES: c1cc(ccc1C(c2ccccc2)CCN(C)C)C
- InChI: InChI=1S/C18H23N/c1-15-9-11-17(12-10-15)18(13-14-19(2)3)16-7-5-4-6-8-16/h4-12,18H,13-14H2,1-3H3; Key:CINROOONPHQHPO-UHFFFAOYSA-N

Tolpropamine is an antihistamine and anticholinergic used as an antipruritic.
