= Mebhydrolin =

Chemical compound

Clinical data
- Other names: 9-Benzyl-2-methyl-2,3,4,9-tetrahydro-1H-gamma-carboline, Incidal, Omeril, Diazolin, Fabahistin, mebhydrolin napadisylate, mebhydroline 1,5-naphthalenedisulfonate
- AHFS/Drugs.com: International Drug Names
- Pregnancy category: Not established
- Routes of administration: Oral
- ATC code: R06AX15 (WHO)

Legal status
- Legal status: In general: ℞ (Prescription only)

Identifiers
- IUPAC name: 5-benzyl-2-methyl-3,4-dihydro-1H-pyrido[4,3-b]indole
- CAS Number: 524-81-2 6153-33-9 (1,5-naphthalenedisulfonate salt)
- PubChem CID: 22530
- ChemSpider: 21129
- UNII: 9SUK9B7XVY
- KEGG: D08161
- CompTox Dashboard (EPA): DTXSID5048558
- ECHA InfoCard: 100.007.606

Chemical and physical data
- Formula: C_{19}H_{20}N_{2}
- Molar mass: 276.383 g·mol^{−1}
- 3D model (JSmol): Interactive image
- SMILES: CN3Cc4c1ccccc1n(Cc2ccccc2)c4CC3
- InChI: InChI=1S/C19H20N2/c1-20-12-11-19-17(14-20)16-9-5-6-10-18(16)21(19)13-15-7-3-2-4-8-15/h2-10H,11-14H2,1H3; Key:FQQIIPAOSKSOJM-UHFFFAOYSA-N

Mebhydrolin (INN) or mebhydroline is an antihistamine. It is not available in the United States, but it is in various other countries under the brand names Bexidal (BD) and Diazolin (RU). It is used for symptomatic relief of allergic symptoms caused by histamine release, including nasal allergies and allergic dermatosis.

Mebhydrolin has been shown to magnify the performance-deficit effects of alcohol.
