= Eletefine =

Identifiers
3D model (JSmol)	Interactive image
ChemSpider	8840283
PubChem CID	10664930
CompTox Dashboard (EPA)	DTXSID001045251
- InChI: InChI=1S/C19H19NO5/c1-22-17-11-8-9-20-16-13-7-5-10(21)4-6-12(25-13)15(14(11)16)18(23-2)19(17)24-3/h6-10,21H,4-5H2,1-3H3/b12-6-,13-7- Key: LRIBDPPXLMPCHW-QXFGSWAMSA-N; InChI=1/C19H19NO5/c1-22-17-11-8-9-20-16-13-7-5-10(21)4-6-12(25-13)15(14(11)16)18(23-2)19(17)24-3/h6-10,21H,4-5H2,1-3H3/b12-6-,13-7- Key: LRIBDPPXLMPCHW-QXFGSWAMBK
- SMILES: O(c4c2c3c(C=1O\C(=C/CC(O)CC=1)c3ncc2)c(OC)c4OC)C

Properties
Chemical formula	C_{19}H_{19}NO_{5}
Molar mass	343.357 g/mol
Appearance	red waxy solid
- Except where otherwise noted, data are given for materials in their standard state (at 25 °C [77 °F], 100 kPa). verify (what is ?) Infobox references

Eletefine is an isoquinoline alkaloid first isolated in 1998 from Cissampelos glaberrima. It is one of few known compounds containing the so-called stephaoxocane skeleton, alongside stephaoxocanidine, excentricine, and the stephalonganines.
