= Hydroxyethylpromethazine =

Chemical compound

Clinical data
- ATC code: R06AD05 (WHO)

Identifiers
- IUPAC name: N-(2-hydroxyethyl)-N,N-dimethyl-1-(10H- phenothiazin-10-yl)propan-2-aminium
- CAS Number: 7647-63-4
- PubChem CID: 16406
- ChemSpider: 15559
- UNII: 571559SLAJ
- CompTox Dashboard (EPA): DTXSID30871861

Chemical and physical data
- Formula: C_{19}H_{25}N_{2}OS^{+}
- Molar mass: 329.48 g·mol^{−1}
- 3D model (JSmol): Interactive image
- SMILES: OCC[N+](C)(C)C(C)CN1c3c(Sc2c1cccc2)cccc3
- InChI: InChI=1S/C19H25N2OS/c1-15(21(2,3)12-13-22)14-20-16-8-4-6-10-18(16)23-19-11-7-5-9-17(19)20/h4-11,15,22H,12-14H2,1-3H3/q+1; Key:PDSVTRQOBUIQBQ-UHFFFAOYSA-N

Hydroxyethylpromethazine is an antihistamine with anticholinergic properties. It is structurally analogous to promethazine.

== See also ==
- Promethazine
