= ATC code D04 =

ATC code D04 Antipruritics, including antihistamines, anesthetics, etc. is a therapeutic subgroup of the Anatomical Therapeutic Chemical Classification System, a system of alphanumeric codes developed by the World Health Organization (WHO) for the classification of drugs and other medical products. Subgroup D04 is part of the anatomical group D Dermatologicals.

Codes for veterinary use (ATCvet codes) can be created by placing the letter Q in front of the human ATC code: for example, QD04. ATCvet codes without corresponding human ATC codes are cited with the leading Q in the following list.
National versions of the ATC classification may include additional codes not present in this list, which follows the WHO version.

== D04A Antipruritics, including antihistamines, anesthetics, etc. ==
=== D04AA Antihistamines for topical use ===
D04AA01 Thonzylamine
D04AA02 Mepyramine
D04AA03 Thenalidine
D04AA04 Tripelennamine
D04AA09 Chloropyramine
D04AA10 Promethazine
D04AA12 Tolpropamine
D04AA13 Dimetindene
D04AA14 Clemastine
D04AA15 Bamipine
D04AA16 Pheniramine
D04AA22 Isothipendyl
D04AA32 Diphenhydramine
D04AA33 Diphenhydramine methylbromide
D04AA34 Chlorphenoxamine

=== D04AB Anesthetics for topical use ===
D04AB01 Lidocaine
D04AB02 Cinchocaine
D04AB03 Oxybuprocaine
D04AB04 Benzocaine
D04AB05 Quinisocaine
D04AB06 Tetracaine
D04AB07 Pramocaine
QD04AB51 Lidocaine, combinations

=== D04AX Other antipruritics ===
D04AX01 Doxepin
