= Pipazetate =

Chemical compound

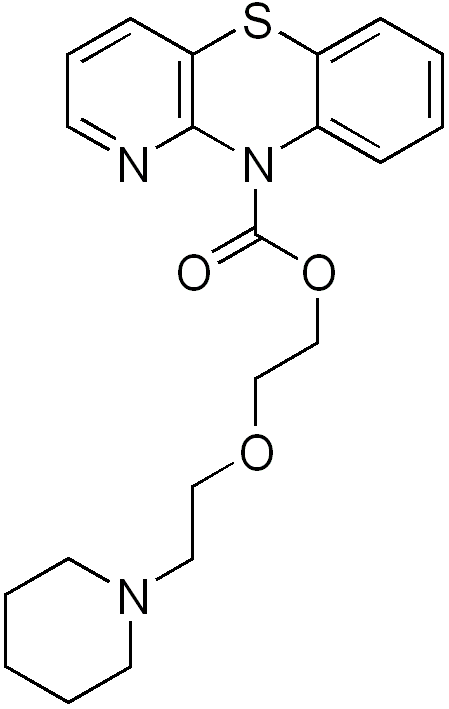

Clinical data
- Trade names: Dipect, Lenopect, Selvignon, Selvigon, Theratuss, Toraxan
- Other names: Pipazethate; D-254; LG-254; SKF-70230A; SQ-15874
- AHFS/Drugs.com: International Drug Names
- Routes of administration: oral
- ATC code: R05DB11 (WHO)

Legal status
- Legal status: ?

Identifiers
- IUPAC name: 2-(2-piperidin-1-ylethoxy)ethyl 10H-pyrido[3,2-b][1,4]benzothiazine-10-carboxylate
- CAS Number: 2167-85-3 6056-11-7 (hydrochloride)
- PubChem CID: 22425
- DrugBank: DB08796
- ChemSpider: 21046
- UNII: M5EK1T5V2L
- KEGG: D05484
- CompTox Dashboard (EPA): DTXSID40176056
- ECHA InfoCard: 100.016.826

Chemical and physical data
- Formula: C_{21}H_{25}N_{3}O_{3}S
- Molar mass: 399.51 g·mol^{−1}
- 3D model (JSmol): Interactive image
- SMILES: O=C(OCCOCCN1CCCCC1)N3c4c(Sc2c3nccc2)cccc4
- InChI: InChI=1S/C21H25N3O3S/c25-21(27-16-15-26-14-13-23-11-4-1-5-12-23)24-17-7-2-3-8-18(17)28-19-9-6-10-22-20(19)24/h2-3,6-10H,1,4-5,11-16H2; Key:DTVJXCOMJLLMAK-UHFFFAOYSA-N

Pipazetate (INN) (brand names Dipect, Lenopect, Selvigon, Theratuss, Toraxan), or pipazethate (USAN), is a 1-azaphenothiazine drug that was briefly marketed as a cough suppressant. It binds to the sigma-1 receptor with an IC_{50} value of 190 nM. It also has local anesthetic action, and in large doses can produce seizures.

As the brand name Theratuss, it was approved by the FDA in 1962, on evidence of safety only. It was withdrawn from the US market in 1972 when the manufacturer, Bristol Myers Squibb, failed to produce evidence of efficacy. Clinical studies showed that it did not decrease cough frequency at recommended dosages.

Infrequent side effects include nausea, vomiting, drowsiness, fatigue, rash, tachycardia and seizures.

== Synthesis ==
Note: 1-azaphenothiazine is also used for making Prothipendyl & Isothipendyl.

Thieme Synthesis: Patent: Revised:

The reaction of 1-azaphenothiazine [261-96-1] (1) with phosgene gives 1-azaphenothiazine-10-carbonyl chloride [94231-78-4] (2). The reaction of this reactive intermediate with 2-[2-(piperidyl)ethoxy]ethanol [3603-43-8] (3) gives the ester, thus completing the synthesis of Pipazethate (4).
