= Homochlorcyclizine =

Chemical compound

Clinical data
- AHFS/Drugs.com: International Drug Names
- Routes of administration: Oral
- ATC code: none

Legal status
- Legal status: In general: ℞ (Prescription only)

Identifiers
- IUPAC name: 1-[(4-chlorophenyl)-phenylmethyl]-4-methyl-1,4-diazepane
- CAS Number: 848-53-3
- PubChem CID: 3627
- ChemSpider: 3501
- UNII: N5MVC31W2N
- KEGG: D08041
- ChEMBL: ChEMBL151447
- CompTox Dashboard (EPA): DTXSID9045635
- ECHA InfoCard: 100.011.545

Chemical and physical data
- Formula: C_{19}H_{23}ClN_{2}
- Molar mass: 314.86 g·mol^{−1}
- 3D model (JSmol): Interactive image
- SMILES: CN1CCCN(CC1)C(C2=CC=CC=C2)C3=CC=C(C=C3)Cl

Homochlorcyclizine (INN) is an antihistamine of the diphenylmethylpiperazine group which has been marketed in Japan since 1965. It is used in the treatment of allergies and other conditions. It also has some anticholinergic, antidopaminergic, and antiserotonergic properties.

== See also ==
- Chlorcyclizine
