= Thiazinamium metilsulfate =

Chemical compound

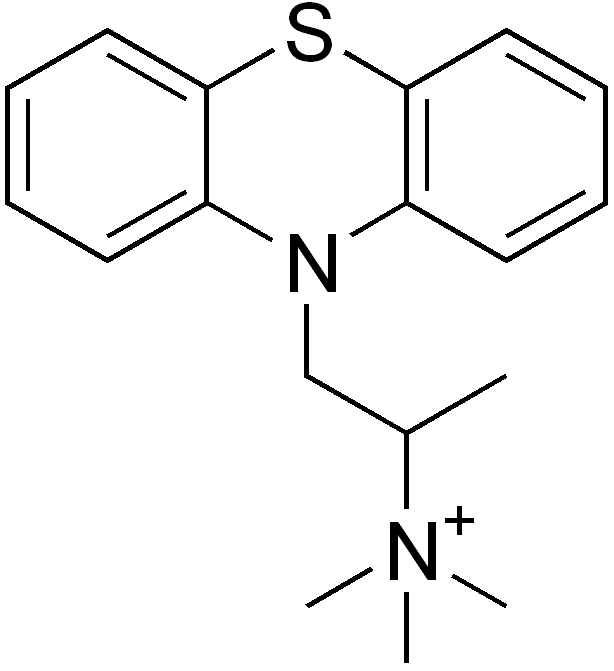
- Thiazinamium

Clinical data
- ATC code: R06AD06 (WHO)

Identifiers
- IUPAC name: N,N,N-trimethyl-1-(10H-phenothiazin-10-yl)propan-2-aminium
- CAS Number: 58-34-4; thiazinamium: 2338-21-8
- PubChem CID: 6015
- ChemSpider: 5793
- UNII: IA16WBX317; thiazinamium: 666W2P28N2
- CompTox Dashboard (EPA): DTXSID001021633
- ECHA InfoCard: 100.017.320

Chemical and physical data
- Formula: C_{18}H_{23}N_{2}S^{+}
- Molar mass: 299.46 g·mol^{−1}
- 3D model (JSmol): Interactive image
- SMILES: CC(CN1C2=CC=CC=C2SC3=CC=CC=C31)[N+](C)(C)C
- InChI: InChI=1S/C18H23N2S.CH4O4S/c1-14(20(2,3)4)13-19-15-9-5-7-11-17(15)21-18-12-8-6-10-16(18)19;1-5-6(2,3)4/h5-12,14H,13H2,1-4H3;1H3,(H,2,3,4)/q+1;/p-1; Key:BVIDQAVCCRUFGU-UHFFFAOYSA-M

Thiazinamium metilsulfate (INN) or thiazinam is an antihistamine. The USAN is thiazinamium chloride (with a different counterion).

== Synthesis ==
Since many of the uses of antihistamines involve conditions such as rashes, which should be treatable by local application, there is some rationale for developing drugs for topical use. The known side effects of antihistamines could in principle be avoided if the drug were functionalized to avoid systemic absorption. The known poor absorption of quat salts make such derivatives attractive for nonabsorbable antihistamines for topical use.

Thiazinamium chloride synthesis from promethazine and chloromethane.

== See also ==
- Phenothiazine
- Promethazine
