= Mizolastine =

Chemical compound

Clinical data
- Trade names: Mizollen
- AHFS/Drugs.com: International Drug Names
- Routes of administration: By mouth (tablets)
- ATC code: R06AX25 (WHO)

Legal status
- Legal status: UK: POM (Prescription only)

Identifiers
- IUPAC name: 2-[{1-[1-(4-Fluorobenzyl)-1H-benzimidazol-2-yl]piperidin-4-yl}(methyl)amino]pyrimidin-4(1H)-one
- CAS Number: 108612-45-9
- PubChem CID: 65906
- ChemSpider: 59315
- UNII: 244O1F90NA
- KEGG: D01117
- ChEMBL: ChEMBL94454
- CompTox Dashboard (EPA): DTXSID5046801
- ECHA InfoCard: 100.149.406

Chemical and physical data
- Formula: C_{24}H_{25}FN_{6}O
- Molar mass: 432.503 g·mol^{−1}
- 3D model (JSmol): Interactive image
- SMILES: CN(C1CCN(CC1)C2=NC3=CC=CC=C3N2CC4=CC=C(C=C4)F)C5=NC=CC(=O)N5
- InChI: InChI=1S/C24H25FN6O/c1-29(23-26-13-10-22(32)28-23)19-11-14-30(15-12-19)24-27-20-4-2-3-5-21(20)31(24)16-17-6-8-18(25)9-7-17/h2-10,13,19H,11-12,14-16H2,1H3,(H,26,28,32); Key:PVLJETXTTWAYEW-UHFFFAOYSA-N

Mizolastine (Tradename: Mizollen) is a once-daily, non-sedating antihistamine. It blocks H_{1} receptors and is commonly fast-acting. It does not prevent the actual release of histamine from mast cells, it only prevents histamine from binding to receptors. Side effects can include dry mouth and throat.

In an animal study, the antihistamine activity of Mizolastine was found to be similar to that of cetrizine and 7-fold more potent relative to loratadine.
