= Meclizine =

Antihistamine medication used for motion sickness

Clinical data
- Trade names: Bonine, Antivert, others
- Other names: Meclozine
- AHFS/Drugs.com: Monograph
- MedlinePlus: a682548
- License data: US DailyMed: Meclizine
- Routes of administration: By mouth, under the tongue, in the cheek
- ATC code: R06AE05 (WHO)

Legal status
- Legal status: AU: S4 (Prescription only); CA: OTC; US: OTC

Pharmacokinetic data
- Bioavailability: 22 - 32%
- Metabolism: Liver (CYP2D6)
- Elimination half-life: 5-6 hours

Identifiers
- IUPAC name: (RS)-1-[(4-chlorophenyl)(phenyl)methyl]-4-(3-methylbenzyl)piperazine
- CAS Number: 569-65-3
- PubChem CID: 4034
- IUPHAR/BPS: 2757
- DrugBank: DB00737
- ChemSpider: 3894
- UNII: 3L5TQ84570
- KEGG: D08163; D01317
- ChEMBL: ChEMBL1623
- CompTox Dashboard (EPA): DTXSID0023242
- ECHA InfoCard: 100.008.477

Chemical and physical data
- Formula: C_{25}H_{27}ClN_{2}
- Molar mass: 390.96 g·mol^{−1}
- 3D model (JSmol): Interactive image
- Boiling point: 230 °C (446 °F)
- SMILES: Clc1ccc(cc1)C(c2ccccc2)N3CCN(CC3)Cc4cccc(c4)C
- InChI: InChI=1S/C25H27ClN2/c1-20-6-5-7-21(18-20)19-27-14-16-28(17-15-27)25(22-8-3-2-4-9-22)23-10-12-24(26)13-11-23/h2-13,18,25H,14-17,19H2,1H3; Key:OCJYIGYOJCODJL-UHFFFAOYSA-N

Meclizine, sold under the brand name Bonine, among others, is an antihistamine used to treat motion sickness and dizziness (vertigo). It is taken by mouth. Effects generally begin in an hour and last for up to a day.

Common side effects include sleepiness and dry mouth. Serious side effects may include allergic reactions. Use in pregnancy appears safe, but has not been well studied; use in breastfeeding is of unclear safety. It is believed to work in part by anticholinergic and antihistamine mechanisms.

Meclizine was patented in 1951 and came into medical use in 1953. It is available as a generic medication and often over the counter. In 2023, it was the 137th most commonly prescribed medication in the United States, with more than 4 million prescriptions.

== Medical uses ==
Meclizine is used to treat symptoms of motion sickness.

=== Motion sickness ===
Meclizine is effective in inhibiting nausea, vomiting, and dizziness caused by motion sickness.

The drug is safe for treating nausea in pregnancy and is a first-line therapy for this use. Meclizine may not be strong enough for especially sickening motion stimuli, and second-line defenses should be tried in those cases.

=== Vertigo ===
Meclizine may be used to treat vertigo, such as in those with Ménière's disease.

== Side effects ==
Some common side effects such as drowsiness, dry mouth, and tiredness may occur. Meclizine has been shown to have fewer dry mouth side effects than the traditional treatment for motion sickness, transdermal scopolamine. A very serious allergic reaction to this drug is unlikely, but immediate medical attention should be sought if it occurs. Symptoms of a serious allergic reaction may include rash, itching, swelling, severe dizziness, and trouble breathing.

== Pharmacology ==
=== Pharmacodynamics ===
Meclizine is an antagonist at H_{1} receptors (K_{i} = 250 nM). It possesses anticholinergic, central nervous system depressant, and local anesthetic effects. Its antiemetic and antivertigo effects are not fully understood, but its central anticholinergic properties are partially responsible. The drug depresses labyrinth excitability and vestibular stimulation, and it may affect the medullary chemoreceptor trigger zone. The drug has been shown to reduce the magnitude of the vestibulo-ocular reflex in healthy volunteers. At the same time the drug was found to have only a small (and statistically insignificant) effect on the motion sensitivity of the utricles. Much as motion sickness arises from a discrepancy between multiple senses, meclizine most likely affects a wide array of sensory mechanisms related to self-motion while leaving the core vestibular response intact.

Meclizine also has been reported to be a weak dopamine antagonist at D_{1}-like and D_{2}-like receptors but it does not cause catalepsy in mice, perhaps because of its anticholinergic activity. The drug does not affect dopamine or serotonin reuptake.

=== Pharmacokinetics ===
Meclizine reaches peak plasma concentration in about 1.5 hours and has an elimination half-life of 5–6 hours. Despite its relatively short half-life, the drug is reported to remain effective for motion sickness for 12 – 24 hours. Meclizine has low bioavailability (22–32%) and a delayed onset to action in part due to its poor solubility in water (0.1 mg/ml) and gastrointestinal fluid. In children it has been found that taking meclizine with food increases its bioavailability slightly. It is metabolized in the liver by the CYP2D6 enzyme. Ten metabolites have been identified. In rats, the main metabolite is norchlorcyclizine, which distributes extensively through body tissue.

== Chemistry ==
Meclizine is a first-generation antihistamine (nonselective H_{1} antagonist) of the piperazine class. It is structurally and pharmacologically similar to buclizine, cyclizine, and hydroxyzine.

=== Synthesis ===
(4-Chlorophenyl)-phenylmethanol is halogenated with thionyl chloride before adding acetylpiperazine. The acetyl group is cleaved with diluted sulfuric acid. An N-alkylation of the piperazine ring with 3-methylbenzylchloride completes the synthesis.

Alternatively, the last step can be replaced by a reductive N-alkylation with 3-methylbenzaldehyde. The reductive agent is hydrogen, and Raney nickel is used as a catalyst.

Meclizine is obtained and used as a racemate, a 1:1 mixture of the two stereoisomers. Drug forms contain the racemic dihydrochloride.

== Society and culture ==
=== Brand names ===
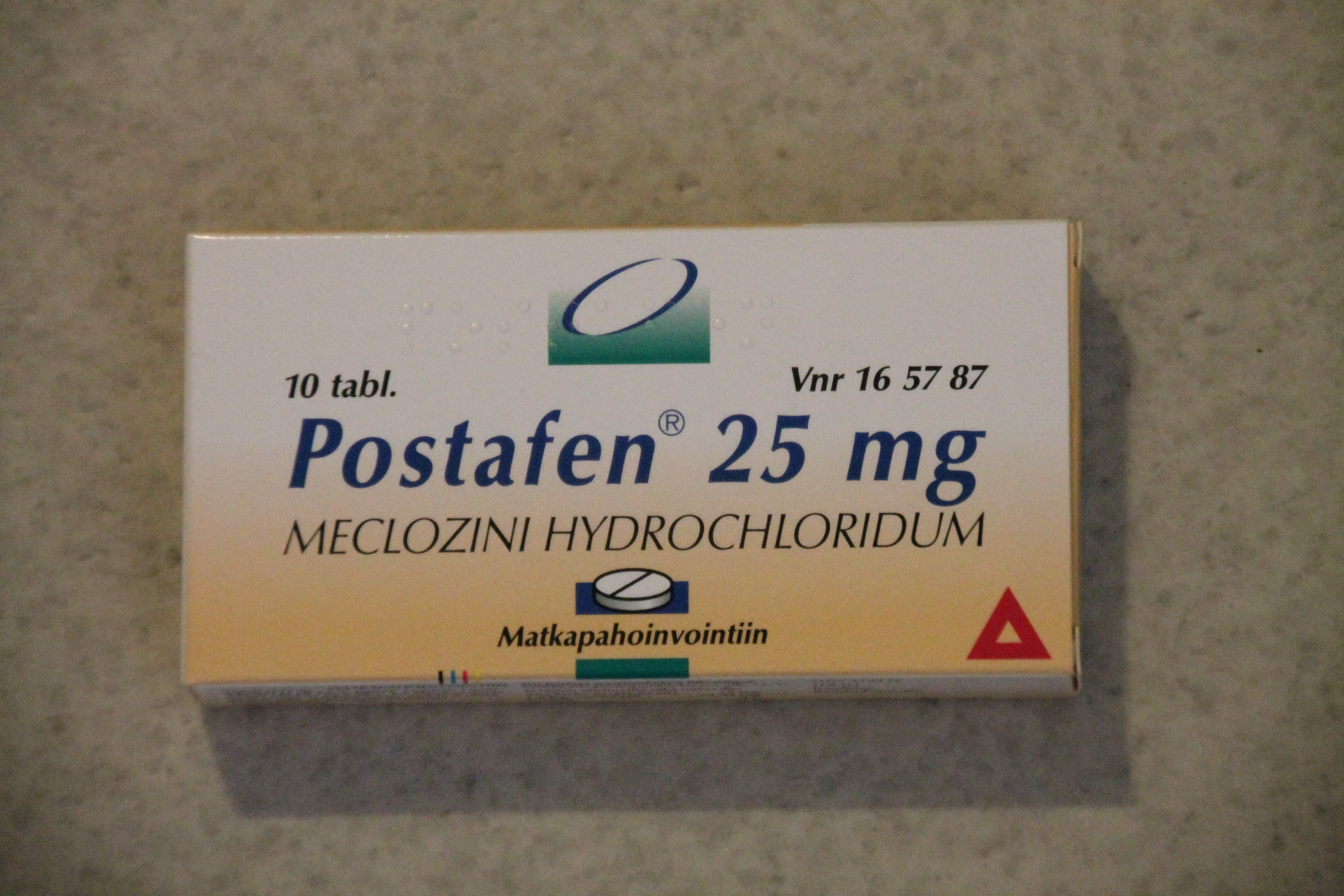
Postafen is one of the brand names of Meclizine.

Meclizine is an international nonproprietary name.

It is sold under the brand names Bonine, Bonamine, Antivert, Postafen, Sea Legs, and Dramamine II (Less Drowsy Formulation). Emesafene is a combination of meclizine (1/3) and pyridoxine (2/3). In Canada, Antivert Tab was a combination of meclizine and nicotinic acid.
