= Talastine =

Chemical compound

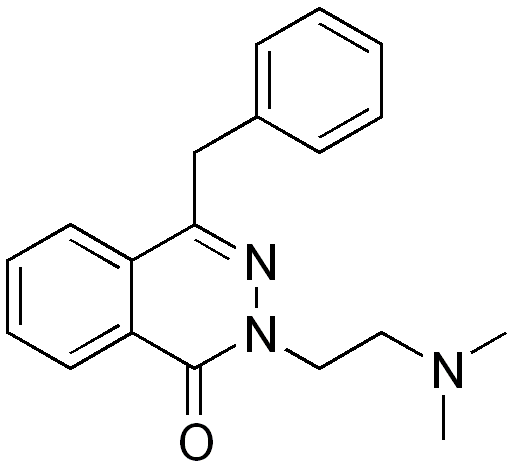

Clinical data
- ATC code: R06AB07 (WHO)

Identifiers
- IUPAC name: 4-benzyl-2-[2-(dimethylamino)ethyl]phthalazin-1(2H)-one
- CAS Number: 16188-61-7
- PubChem CID: 65624
- ChemSpider: 59065
- UNII: 49AB2PA48B
- CompTox Dashboard (EPA): DTXSID20167265

Chemical and physical data
- Formula: C_{19}H_{21}N_{3}O
- Molar mass: 307.397 g·mol^{−1}
- 3D model (JSmol): Interactive image
- SMILES: O=C1c3ccccc3\C(=N/N1CCN(C)C)Cc2ccccc2
- InChI: InChI=1S/C19H21N3O/c1-21(2)12-13-22-19(23)17-11-7-6-10-16(17)18(20-22)14-15-8-4-3-5-9-15/h3-11H,12-14H2,1-2H3; Key:LCAAMXMULMCKLJ-UHFFFAOYSA-N

Talastine (trade name Ahanon) is an antihistamine.

== Synthesis ==
The amide proton from 4-Benzylphalazone is abstracted with KOH, which is then alkylated with dimethylaminoethyl chloride.
