= Chlorphenoxamine =

Chemical compound

Clinical data
- AHFS/Drugs.com: International Drug Names
- Routes of administration: Oral, topical
- ATC code: D04AA34 (WHO) R06AA06 (WHO)

Pharmacokinetic data
- Bioavailability: Well absorbed
- Metabolism: Likely liver
- Excretion: kidney

Identifiers
- IUPAC name: {2-[1-(4-chlorophenyl)-1-phenylethoxy]ethyl}dimethylamine
- CAS Number: 77-38-3 562-09-4
- PubChem CID: 6475
- DrugBank: DB09007
- ChemSpider: 6230
- UNII: 3UVD77BP8R
- KEGG: D07198
- ChEMBL: ChEMBL2110774
- CompTox Dashboard (EPA): DTXSID5022805
- ECHA InfoCard: 100.115.538

Chemical and physical data
- Formula: C_{18}H_{22}ClNO
- Molar mass: 303.83 g·mol^{−1}
- 3D model (JSmol): Interactive image
- SMILES: Clc1ccc(cc1)C(OCCN(C)C)(c2ccccc2)C
- InChI: InChI=1S/C18H22ClNO/c1-18(21-14-13-20(2)3,15-7-5-4-6-8-15)16-9-11-17(19)12-10-16/h4-12H,13-14H2,1-3H3; Key:KKHPNPMTPORSQE-UHFFFAOYSA-N

Chlorphenoxamine (Phenoxene) is an antihistamine and anticholinergic used as an antipruritic and antiparkinsonian agent. It is an analog of diphenhydramine.
