= Pipoxizine =

Chemical compound

Clinical data
- ATC code: None

Identifiers
- IUPAC name: 2-(2-{2-[4-(Diphenylmethylene)-1-piperidinyl]ethoxy}ethoxy)ethanol
- CAS Number: 55837-21-3
- PubChem CID: 68750
- ChemSpider: 61995
- UNII: B9A98D632Z
- CompTox Dashboard (EPA): DTXSID30866510

Chemical and physical data
- Formula: C_{24}H_{31}NO_{3}
- Molar mass: 381.516 g·mol^{−1}
- 3D model (JSmol): Interactive image
- SMILES: c1ccc(cc1)C(=C2CCN(CC2)CCOCCOCCO)c3ccccc3
- InChI: InChI=1S/C24H31NO3/c26-16-18-28-20-19-27-17-15-25-13-11-23(12-14-25)24(21-7-3-1-4-8-21)22-9-5-2-6-10-22/h1-10,26H,11-20H2; Key:SCMPXORBOTWFTI-UHFFFAOYSA-N

Pipoxizine (INN) is a first-generation antihistamine as well as serotonin antagonist of the diphenylmethylpiperazine group related to hydroxyzine. It was investigated as a bronchodilator but was never marketed.
