= Bamipine =

Chemical compound

Clinical data
- Trade names: Soventol
- AHFS/Drugs.com: International Drug Names
- Routes of administration: Oral?, topical
- ATC code: D04AA15 (WHO) R06AX01 (WHO)

Identifiers
- IUPAC name: N-benzyl-1-methyl-N-phenyl-piperidin-4-amine
- CAS Number: 4945-47-5
- PubChem CID: 72075
- ChemSpider: 65061
- UNII: Y6BHZ28O92
- KEGG: D07197
- ChEMBL: ChEMBL520400
- CompTox Dashboard (EPA): DTXSID5057751
- ECHA InfoCard: 100.023.261

Chemical and physical data
- Formula: C_{19}H_{24}N_{2}
- Molar mass: 280.415 g·mol^{−1}
- 3D model (JSmol): Interactive image
- SMILES: N(c1ccccc1)(Cc2ccccc2)C3CCN(C)CC3
- InChI: InChI=1S/C19H24N2/c1-20-14-12-19(13-15-20)21(18-10-6-3-7-11-18)16-17-8-4-2-5-9-17/h2-11,19H,12-16H2,1H3; Key:VZSXTYKGYWISGQ-UHFFFAOYSA-N

Bamipine (trade name Soventol) is a pharmaceutical drug acting as an H_{1} antihistamine with anticholinergic properties. It is used as an antipruritic ointment. No oral use is known.

== Adverse effects ==
Side effects are typical of an old (first-generation) antihistamine: tiredness in adults, agitation in children, mydriasis (dilation of the pupils). These effects are rare when bamipine is applied topically as an ointment. Allergic and hypersensitivity reactions are also rare. Acute eczema can be worsened by bamipine ointment.

== Contraindications and interactions ==
No clinically relevant contraindications or interactions with other drugs are known.

== Pharmacology ==
=== Pharmacokinetics ===
When applied topically, the maximal effect is reached after 20 to 60 minutes and lasts up to 48 hours. Bamipine is not absorbed through intact skin in relevant doses.
