= ATC code R06 =

ATC code R06 Antihistamines for systemic use is a therapeutic subgroup of the Anatomical Therapeutic Chemical Classification System, a system of alphanumeric codes developed by the World Health Organization (WHO) for the classification of drugs and other medical products. Subgroup R06 is part of the anatomical group R Respiratory system.

Codes for veterinary use (ATCvet codes) can be created by placing the letter Q in front of the human ATC code: for example, QR06.
National versions of the ATC classification may include additional codes not present in this list, which follows the WHO version.

== R06A Antihistamines for systemic use ==
=== R06AA Aminoalkyl ethers ===
R06AA01 Bromazine
R06AA02 Diphenhydramine
R06AA04 Clemastine
R06AA06 Chlorphenoxamine
R06AA07 Diphenylpyraline
R06AA08 Carbinoxamine
R06AA09 Doxylamine
R06AA10 Trimethobenzamide
R06AA11 Dimenhydrinate
R06AA52 Diphenhydramine, combinations
R06AA54 Clemastine, combinations
R06AA56 Chlorphenoxamine, combinations
R06AA57 Diphenylpyraline, combinations
R06AA59 Doxylamine, combinations
R06AA61 Dimenhydrinate, combinations

=== R06AB Substituted alkylamines ===
R06AB01 Brompheniramine
R06AB02 Dexchlorpheniramine
R06AB03 Dimetindene
R06AB04 Chlorphenamine
R06AB05 Pheniramine
R06AB06 Dexbrompheniramine
R06AB07 Talastine
R06AB51 Brompheniramine, combinations
R06AB52 Dexchlorpheniramine, combinations
R06AB54 Chlorphenamine, combinations
R06AB56 Dexbrompheniramine, combinations

=== R06AC Substituted ethylene diamines ===
R06AC01 Mepyramine
R06AC02 Histapyrrodine
R06AC03 Chloropyramine
R06AC04 Tripelennamine
R06AC05 Methapyrilene
R06AC06 Thonzylamine
R06AC52 Histapyrrodine, combinations
R06AC53 Chloropyramine, combinations

=== R06AD Phenothiazine derivatives ===
R06AD01 Alimemazine
R06AD02 Promethazine
R06AD03 Thiethylperazine
R06AD04 Methdilazine
R06AD05 Hydroxyethylpromethazine
R06AD06 Thiazinam
R06AD07 Mequitazine
R06AD08 Oxomemazine
R06AD09 Isothipendyl
R06AD52 Promethazine, combinations
R06AD55 Hydroxyethylpromethazine, combinations

=== R06AE Piperazine derivatives ===
R06AE01 Buclizine
R06AE03 Cyclizine
R06AE04 Chlorcyclizine
R06AE05 Meclozine
R06AE06 Oxatomide
R06AE07 Cetirizine
R06AE09 Levocetirizine
R06AE51 Buclizine, combinations
R06AE53 Cyclizine, combinations
R06AE55 Meclozine, combinations

=== R06AK Combinations of antihistamines ===
Empty group

=== R06AX Other antihistamines for systemic use ===
R06AX01 Bamipine
R06AX02 Cyproheptadine
R06AX03 Thenalidine
R06AX04 Phenindamine
R06AX05 Antazoline
R06AX07 Triprolidine
R06AX08 Pyrrobutamine
R06AX09 Azatadine
R06AX11 Astemizole
R06AX12 Terfenadine
R06AX13 Loratadine
R06AX15 Mebhydrolin
R06AX16 Deptropine
R06AX17 Ketotifen
R06AX18 Acrivastine
R06AX19 Azelastine
R06AX21 Tritoqualine
R06AX22 Ebastine
R06AX23 Pimethixene
R06AX24 Epinastine
R06AX25 Mizolastine
R06AX26 Fexofenadine
R06AX27 Desloratadine
R06AX28 Rupatadine
R06AX29 Bilastine
R06AX31 Quifenadine
R06AX32 Sequifenadine
R06AX53 Thenalidine, combinations
R06AX58 Pyrrobutamine, combinations
