= Histapyrrodine =

Chemical compound

Clinical data
- Routes of administration: Oral
- ATC code: R06AC02 (WHO) R06AC52 (WHO) (combinations)

Identifiers
- IUPAC name: N-benzyl-N-(2-pyrrolidin-1-ylethyl)aniline
- CAS Number: 493-80-1
- PubChem CID: 68122
- ChemSpider: 61430
- UNII: 0FYM61NG4D
- KEGG: D07400
- ChEMBL: ChEMBL2105039
- CompTox Dashboard (EPA): DTXSID20197764
- ECHA InfoCard: 100.007.075

Chemical and physical data
- Formula: C_{19}H_{24}N_{2}
- Molar mass: 280.415 g·mol^{−1}
- 3D model (JSmol): Interactive image
- SMILES: N(c1ccccc1)(Cc2ccccc2)CCN3CCCC3
- InChI: InChI=1S/C19H24N2/c1-3-9-18(10-4-1)17-21(19-11-5-2-6-12-19)16-15-20-13-7-8-14-20/h1-6,9-12H,7-8,13-17H2; Key:MXHODDGKGSGCDI-UHFFFAOYSA-N

Histapyrrodine is an antihistamine with anticholinergic properties.
