= Isothipendyl =

Chemical compound

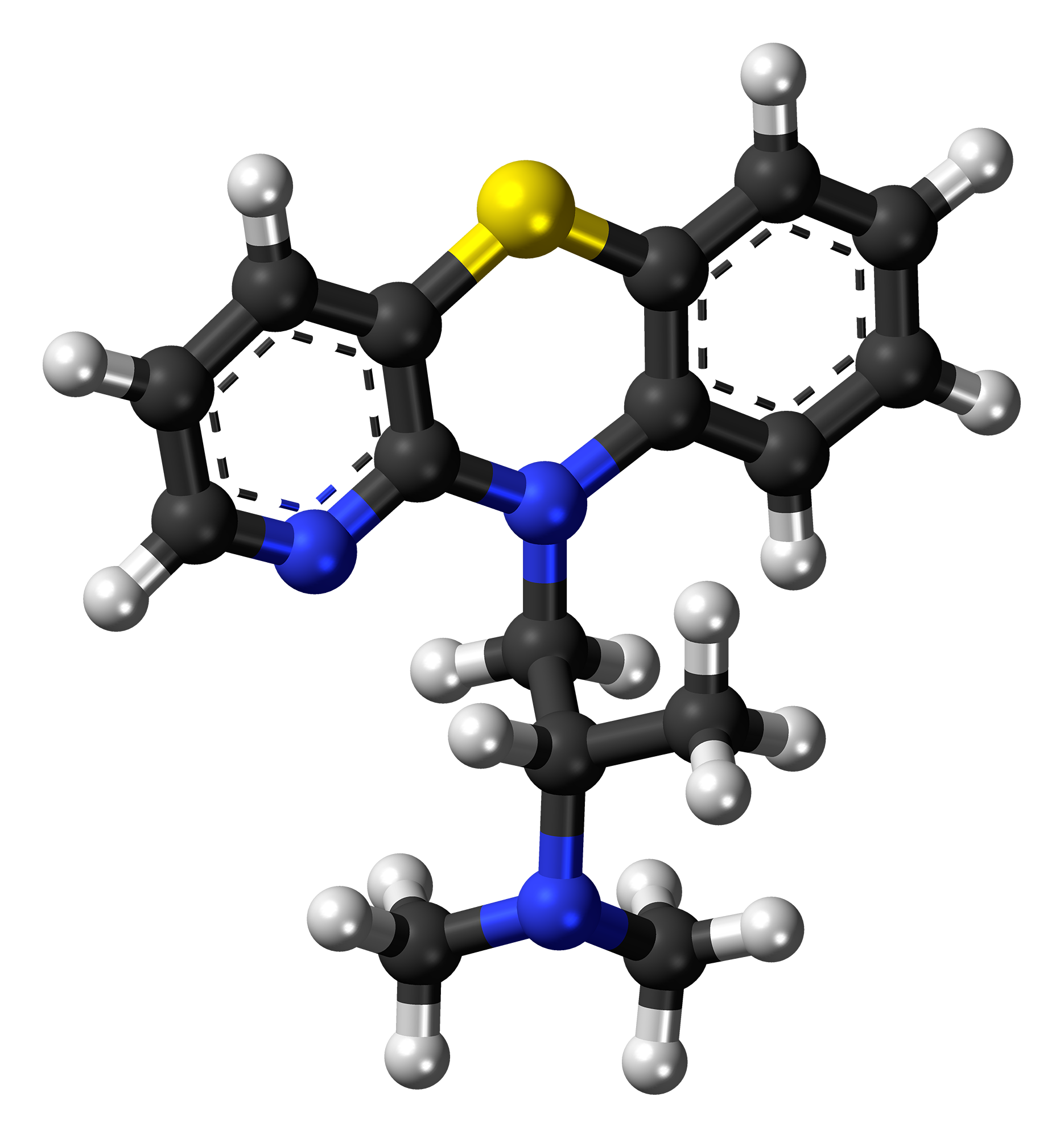

Clinical data
- AHFS/Drugs.com: International Drug Names
- ATC code: D04AA22 (WHO) R06AD09 (WHO)

Identifiers
- IUPAC name: N,N-dimethyl-1-(10H-pyrido[3,2-b][1,4]benzothiazin-10-yl)propan-2-amine
- CAS Number: 482-15-5 1225-65-6
- PubChem CID: 3781
- DrugBank: DB08802
- ChemSpider: 3649
- UNII: WVZ7K9P0JY
- KEGG: D08091
- CompTox Dashboard (EPA): DTXSID5048267
- ECHA InfoCard: 100.006.890

Chemical and physical data
- Formula: C_{16}H_{19}N_{3}S
- Molar mass: 285.41 g·mol^{−1}
- 3D model (JSmol): Interactive image
- SMILES: n2c1N(c3c(Sc1ccc2)cccc3)CC(N(C)C)C
- InChI: InChI=1S/C16H19N3S/c1-12(18(2)3)11-19-13-7-4-5-8-14(13)20-15-9-6-10-17-16(15)19/h4-10,12H,11H2,1-3H3; Key:OQJBSDFFQWMKBQ-UHFFFAOYSA-N

Isothipendyl is a 1st generation H_{1} antagonist (antihistamine) and anticholinergic used as an antipruritic. In the 2020s, at least, it is rarely used in the first line relief of allergies due to the anticholinergic side effect of somnolence but does have some limited use through topical application in the relief of insect bites and related itching (pruritus).

== See also ==
- Promethazine
- Prothipendyl
