= Quinisocaine =

Chemical compound

Clinical data
- AHFS/Drugs.com: International Drug Names
- ATC code: D04AB05 (WHO)

Identifiers
- IUPAC name: 2-(3-Butylisoquinolin-1-yl)oxy-N,N-dimethyl-ethanamine
- CAS Number: 86-80-6
- PubChem CID: 6857
- ChemSpider: 6596
- UNII: 772EN3BH6I
- KEGG: D08462
- ChEMBL: ChEMBL127643
- CompTox Dashboard (EPA): DTXSID8048525
- ECHA InfoCard: 100.001.546

Chemical and physical data
- Formula: C_{17}H_{24}N_{2}O
- Molar mass: 272.392 g·mol^{−1}
- 3D model (JSmol): Interactive image
- SMILES: O(c2nc(cc1ccccc12)CCCC)CCN(C)C
- InChI: InChI=1S/C17H24N2O/c1-4-5-9-15-13-14-8-6-7-10-16(14)17(18-15)20-12-11-19(2)3/h6-8,10,13H,4-5,9,11-12H2,1-3H3; Key:XNMYNYSCEJBRPZ-UHFFFAOYSA-N

Quinisocaine (INN), also known as dimethisoquin (BAN and USAN), is a topical anesthetic used as an antipruritic.

== Synthesis ==
Quinisocaine can be synthesized starting from phthalaldehydic acid. Patent: The Henry reaction between phthalaldehydic acid (1) and 1-nitropentane occurs by a mechanism that involves a hydroxy acid (2). Expulsion of water then gives the lactone 3. Reduction of the nitro group via catalytic hydrogenation leads to the amine 4. Treatment of that amine with sodium hydroxide leads to ring opening of the lactone ring to the intermediary amino acid (5). This cyclizes spontaneously to the lactam to give the isoquinoline derivative 7. Dehydration by means of strong acid gives 3-butylisocarbostyril (8). Phosphorus oxychloride converts the oxygen function to the corresponding chloride via the enol forms 3-butyl-1-chloroisoquinoline (9). Displacement of halogen with the sodium salt from 2-dimethylaminoethanol (10) affords dimethisoquin (11).

Synthesis of quinisocaine
