= Thenalidine =

Chemical compound

Clinical data
- ATC code: D04AA03 (WHO) R06AX03 (WHO) R06AX53 (WHO) (combinations)

Identifiers
- IUPAC name: 1-Methyl-N-phenyl-N-(2-thienylmethyl)piperidin-4-amine
- CAS Number: 86-12-4
- PubChem CID: 27901
- DrugBank: DB04826
- ChemSpider: 25957
- UNII: 6U94N2D00F
- KEGG: D07194
- CompTox Dashboard (EPA): DTXSID1048835
- ECHA InfoCard: 100.001.501

Chemical and physical data
- Formula: C_{17}H_{22}N_{2}S
- Molar mass: 286.44 g·mol^{−1}
- 3D model (JSmol): Interactive image
- SMILES: s1c(ccc1)CN(c2ccccc2)C3CCN(C)CC3
- InChI: InChI=1S/C17H22N2S/c1-18-11-9-16(10-12-18)19(14-17-8-5-13-20-17)15-6-3-2-4-7-15/h2-8,13,16H,9-12,14H2,1H3; Key:KLOHYVOVXOUKQI-UHFFFAOYSA-N

Thenalidine is an antihistamine with anticholinergic properties used as an antipruritic drug. It was withdrawn from the US, Canadian, and UK markets in 1963 due to a risk of neutropenia.
