= Prothipendyl =

Names
- Preferred IUPAC name N,N-Dimethyl-3-(10H-pyrido[3,2-b][1,4]benzothiazin-10-yl)propan-1-amine

Identifiers
CAS Number	303-69-5
3D model (JSmol)	Interactive image
ChemSpider	14002
ECHA InfoCard	100.132.989
EC Number	214-958-4
PubChem CID	14670
UNII	5O6VWA87VA
CompTox Dashboard (EPA)	DTXSID50184389
- InChI: InChI=1S/C16H19N3S/c1-18(2)11-6-12-19-13-7-3-4-8-14(13)20-15-9-5-10-17-16(15)19/h3-5,7-10H,6,11-12H2,1-2H3 Key: JTTAUPUMOLRVRA-UHFFFAOYSA-N; InChI=1/C16H19N3S/c1-18(2)11-6-12-19-13-7-3-4-8-14(13)20-15-9-5-10-17-16(15)19/h3-5,7-10H,6,11-12H2,1-2H3 Key: JTTAUPUMOLRVRA-UHFFFAOYAL
- SMILES: CN(C)CCCN1C2=CC=CC=C2SC3=C1N=CC=C3

Properties
Chemical formula	C_{16}H_{19}N_{3}S
Molar mass	285.40716

Pharmacology
ATC code	N05AX07 (WHO)
Legal status	BR: Class C1 (Other controlled substances)
- Except where otherwise noted, data are given for materials in their standard state (at 25 °C [77 °F], 100 kPa). verify (what is ?) Infobox references

Prothipendyl (brand names Dominal, Timovan, Tolnate), also known as azapromazine or phrenotropin, is an anxiolytic, antiemetic, and antihistamine of the azaphenothiazine group which is marketed in Europe and is used to treat anxiety and agitation in psychotic syndromes. It differs from promazine only by the replacement of one carbon atom with a nitrogen atom in the tricyclic ring system. Prothipendyl is said to not possess antipsychotic effects, and in accordance, appears to be a weaker dopamine receptor antagonist than other phenothiazines.

== Synthesis ==
See also: Pipazetate.

Synthesis: Patents:

1-Azaphenothiazine [261-96-1] (1) 3-Dimethylaminopropyl chloride [109-54-6] (2) Sodium hydride suspension
