= Piperazine =

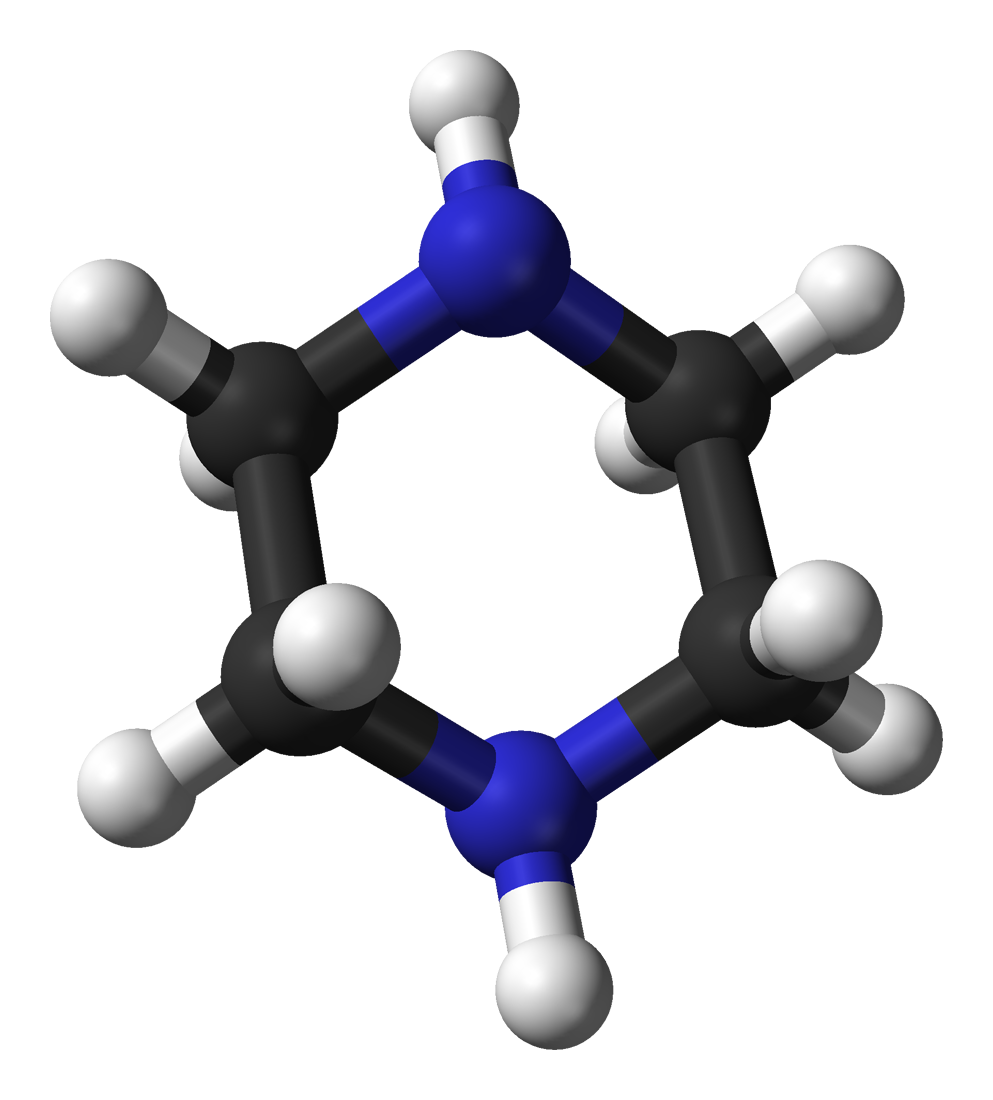

Names
- Preferred IUPAC name Piperazine
- Systematic IUPAC name 1,4-Diazacyclohexane
- Other names Hexahydropyrazine; Piperazidine; Diethylenediamine; 1,4-Diazinane

Identifiers
CAS Number	110-85-0
3D model (JSmol)	Interactive image
ChEBI	CHEBI:28568
ChEMBL	ChEMBL1412
ChemSpider	13835459
DrugBank	DB00592
ECHA InfoCard	100.003.463
KEGG	D00807
PubChem CID	4837
UNII	1RTM4PAL0V
CompTox Dashboard (EPA)	DTXSID1021164
- InChI: InChI=1S/C4H10N2/c1-2-6-4-3-5-1/h5-6H,1-4H2 Key: GLUUGHFHXGJENI-UHFFFAOYSA-N; InChI=1S/C4H10N2/c1-2-6-4-3-5-1/h5-6H,1-4H2
- SMILES: C1CNCCN1

Properties
Chemical formula	C_{4}H_{10}N_{2}
Molar mass	86.138 g·mol^{−1}
Appearance	White crystalline solid
Melting point	106 °C (223 °F; 379 K)
Boiling point	146 °C (295 °F; 419 K) Sublimes
Solubility in water	Freely soluble
Acidity (pK_{a})	9.8
Basicity (pK_{b})	4.19
Magnetic susceptibility (χ)	−56.8·10^{−6} cm^{3}/mol

Pharmacology
ATC code	P02CB01 (WHO)
- Pharmacokinetics
Protein binding	60-70%

Hazards
NFPA 704 (fire diamond)	2 2 0
- Except where otherwise noted, data are given for materials in their standard state (at 25 °C [77 °F], 100 kPa). verify (what is ?) Infobox references

Piperazine (/paɪˈpɛrəziːn/) is an organic compound with the formula (CH_{2}CH_{2}NH)_{2}. In terms of its structure, it can be described as cyclohexane with the 1- and 4-CH_{2} groups replaced by NH. Piperazine exists as a deliquescent solid with a saline taste. Piperazine is freely soluble in water and ethylene glycol, but poorly soluble in diethyl ether. Piperazine is commonly available industrially as the hexahydrate, (CH_{2}CH_{2}NH)_{2}·6H_{2}O, which melts at 44 °C and boils at 125–130 °C.

Substituted derivatives of piperazine are a broad class of chemical compounds. Many piperazines have useful pharmacological properties, with prominent examples including sildenafil, ciprofloxacin, and ziprasidone.

== Origin and naming ==
Piperazines were originally named because of their chemical similarity with piperidine, part of the structure of piperine in the black pepper plant (Piper nigrum). The -az- infix added to "piperazine" refers to the extra nitrogen atom, compared to piperidine. However, piperazines are not in general derived from plants in the genus Piper.

== Synthesis and structure ==
Piperazine is formed by the ammoniation of either 1,2-dichloroethane or ethanolamine. This reaction is mainly used for production of ethylene diamine, but piperazine is a side product. The piperazine is separated from the product stream, which, in addition to ethylenediamine, also contains various derivatives containing CH_{2}CH_{2}NH subunits, e.g. diethylenetriamine, aminoethylpiperazine, and other related linear and cyclic chemicals of this type.

Piperazine can also be synthesized by reduction of pyrazine with sodium in ethanol.

As confirmed by X-ray crystallography, piperidine is a centrosymmetric molecule. The ring adopts a chair conformation and the two N-H groups are equatorial.

== Reactions ==
Its basicity is that of a typical amine. The pH of a 10% aqueous solution of piperazine is 10.8–11.8. The two pK_{a}'s are 5.35 and 9.73 at 25 °C.

Piperazine readily absorbs water and carbon dioxide from the air. Carbon dioxide produces a series of carbamates. Some of the relevant equilibria are:

HN(CH_{2}CH_{2})_{2}NH + CO_{2} ⇌ H_{2}N^{+}(CH_{2}CH_{2})_{2}NCO^{−}_{2}
2 HN(CH_{2}CH_{2})_{2}NH + CO_{2} ⇌ HN(CH_{2}CH_{2})_{2}NCO^{−}_{2} + HN(CH_{2}CH_{2})_{2}NH^{+}_{2}
H_{2}N^{+}(CH_{2}CH_{2})_{2}NCO^{−}_{2} + CO_{2} ⇌ HO_{2}CN(CH_{2}CH_{2})_{2}NCO_{2}H

As a basic amine, piperazine forms a variety of coordination complexes, usually binding to metals as a unidentate ligand (bidentate binding would require the boat conformation). One example is the polymer [CoCl_{2}(piperazine)]_{n}, which features tetrahedral cobalt centers linked by bridging piperazine ligands.

Piperazine is easily N-alkylated. Depending on conditions mono- or dialkyl derivatives are obtained.

== Uses ==
=== As an anthelmintic ===
Piperazine was marketed by Bayer as an anthelmintic in the early 20th century, and was featured in print ads alongside other popular Bayer products at the time, including heroin. In fact, a large number of piperazine compounds have an anthelmintic action. Their mode of action is generally by paralysing parasites, which allows the host body to easily expel the invasive organism. The neuromuscular effects are thought to be caused by blocking acetylcholine at the myoneural junction. This action is mediated by its agonist effects upon the inhibitory GABA (γ-aminobutyric acid) receptor. Its selectivity for helminths is because vertebrates use GABA only in the CNS, and the GABA receptor of helminths is of a different isoform from that of vertebrates.

Piperazine hydrate, piperazine adipate and piperazine citrate (used to treat ascariasis and enterobiasis) are the most common anthelmintic piperazine compounds. These drugs are often referred to simply as "piperazine" which may cause confusion between the specific anthelmintic drugs, the entire class of piperazine-containing compounds, and the compound itself.

Two common salts in the form of which piperazine is usually prepared for pharmaceutical or veterinary purposes are the citrate, 3C_{4}H_{10}N_{2}·2C_{6}H_{8}O_{7} (i.e. containing 3 molecules of piperazine to 2 molecules of citric acid), and the adipate, C_{4}H_{10}N_{2}·C_{6}H_{10}O_{4} (containing 1 molecule each of piperazine and adipic acid).

=== Piperazine derivatives as drugs ===
Many notable drugs contain a piperazine ring as part of their molecular structure. They may be used as antiparasitic drugs. Other examples include: Diethylcarbamazine, a derivative of piperazine, is used to treat some types of filariasis.

Most of these agents can be classified as either phenylpiperazines, benzylpiperazines, diphenylmethylpiperazines (benzhydrylpiperazines), pyridinylpiperazines, pyrimidinylpiperazines, or tricyclics (with the piperazine ring attached to the heterocyclic moiety via a side chain).

The antibacterial agent piperacillin takes its name from a piperazine ring substituted onto a penicillin core, conferring it activity against Pseudomonas aeruginosa. Similarly, ciprofloxacin and levofloxacin are antipseudomonal fluoroquinolones by virtue of their piperazine rings.

=== Other uses ===
Piperazine is also a fluid used for CO_{2} and H_{2}S scrubbing in association with methyl diethanolamine (MDEA).

== Safety ==
Piperazines, such as BZP and TFMPP were common adulterants in the club and rave scene, often being passed off as MDMA, although they do not share many similarities in their effects.

== See also ==
- Amine gas treating
- Methyl diethanolamine
- Piperidine
