= Diphenylmethylpiperazine =

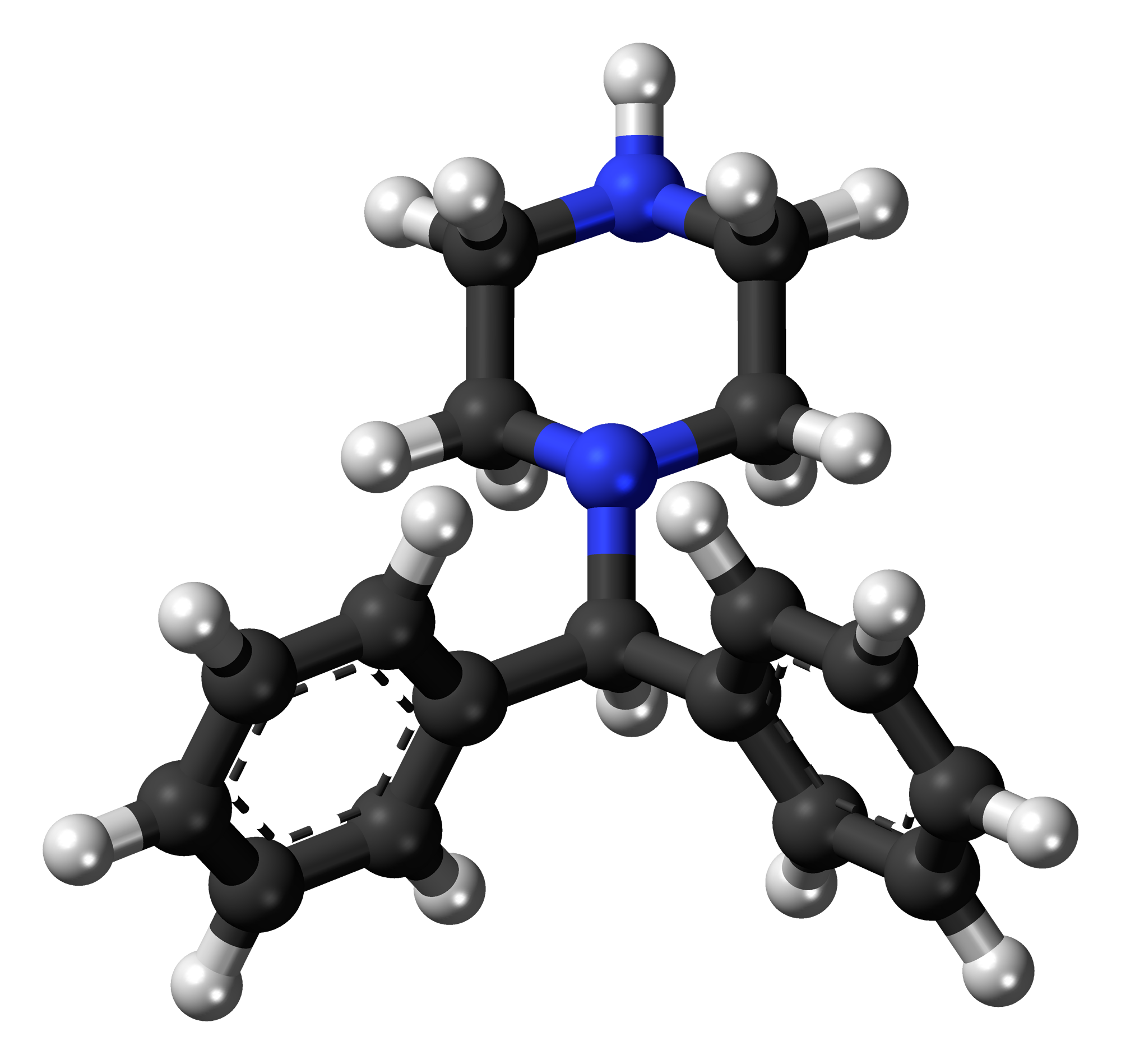

Names
- Preferred IUPAC name 1-(Diphenylmethyl)piperazine
- Other names 1-benzhydrylpiperazine; Norcyclizine

Identifiers
CAS Number	841-77-0
3D model (JSmol)	Interactive image
ChemSpider	63238
ECHA InfoCard	100.011.516
PubChem CID	70048
UNII	NU6V5ZHD9P
CompTox Dashboard (EPA)	DTXSID80232968
- InChI: InChI=1S/C17H20N2/c1-3-7-15(8-4-1)17(16-9-5-2-6-10-16)19-13-11-18-12-14-19/h1-10,17-18H,11-14H2
- SMILES: c1c(cccc1)C(c2ccccc2)N3CCNCC3

Properties
Chemical formula	C_{17}H_{20}N_{2}
Molar mass	252.361 g·mol^{−1}
- Except where otherwise noted, data are given for materials in their standard state (at 25 °C [77 °F], 100 kPa). Infobox references

Diphenylmethylpiperazine, also known as benzhydrylpiperazine, is a chemical compound and piperazine derivative. It features a piperazine ring with a benzhydryl (diphenylmethyl) group bound to one of the nitrogens. Cyclizine, an antihistamine and anticholinergic drug used to treat motion sickness, is the methylated derivative of diphenylmethylpiperazine, and the antihistamine cinnarizine is another derivative. 1-Benzhydrylpiperazine has been described as having "amphetamine-like effects".
