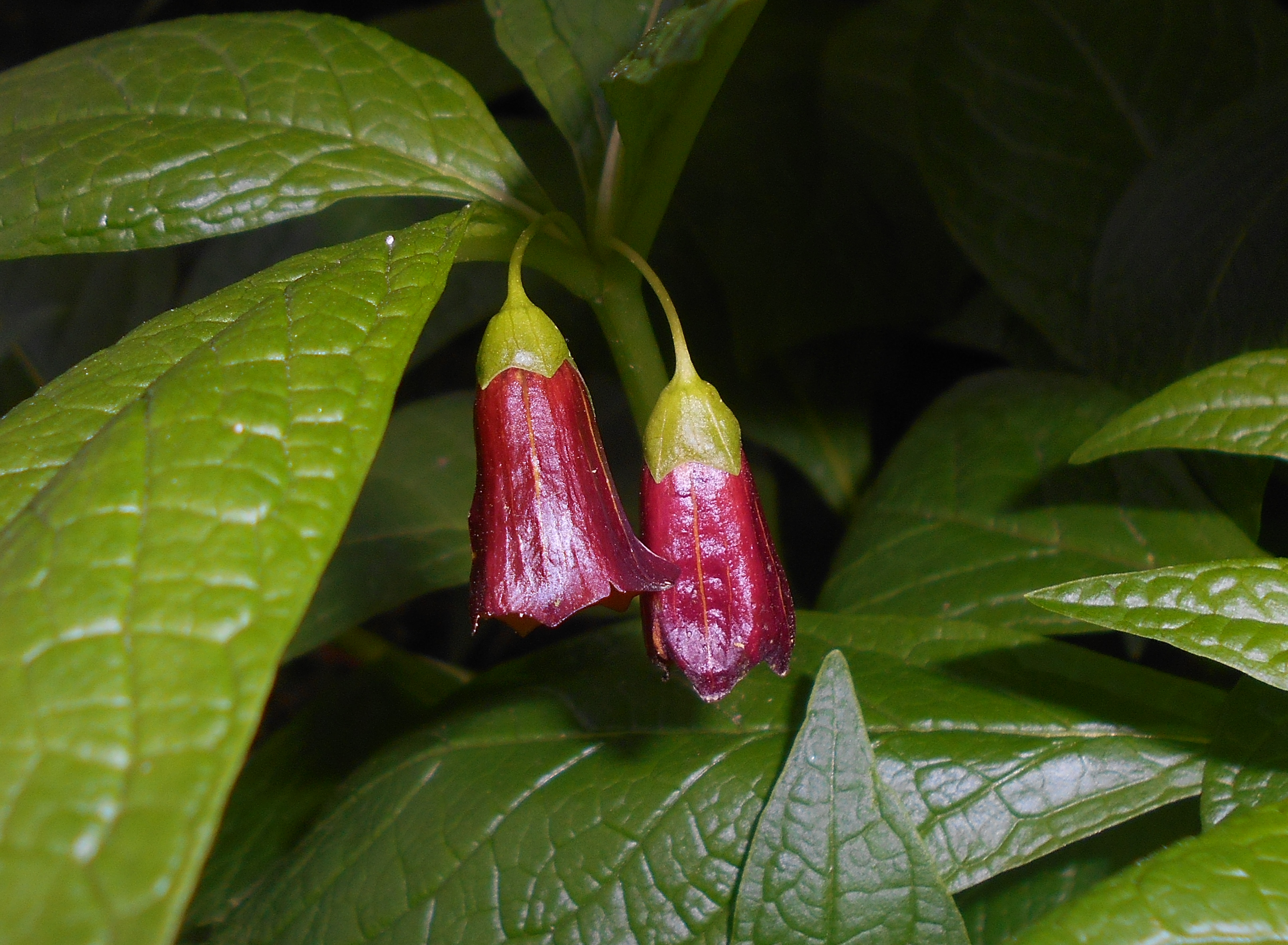

Scientific classification
- Kingdom: Plantae
- Clade: Tracheophytes
- Clade: Angiosperms
- Clade: Eudicots
- Clade: Asterids
- Order: Solanales
- Family: Solanaceae
- Genus: Scopolia
- Species: S. carniolica

Binomial name
- Scopolia carniolica Jacq.

= Scopolia carniolica =

Species of plant

Scopolia carniolica, the European scopolia or henbane bell, is a poisonous plant belonging to tribe Hyoscyameae of the nightshade family Solanaceae. It bears dark brownish-violet nodding flowers on long, slender pedicels. It grows to 60 centimetres (24 in) in height. Its toxicity derives from its high levels of tropane alkaloids, particularly atropine. The concentration of atropine is highest in the roots.

Scopolia carniolica grows on wet soils in beech forests of Southeastern Europe from lowlands to the mountainous zones, being native to a region stretching from the eastern Alps to the eastern Carpathians and also naturalised farther east in southwestern Russia. The rare form Scopolia carniolica f. hladnikiana (which differs from the common form in having a corolla that is greenish yellow, both inside and out) is native to Slovenia.

Scopolia carniolica was first described by the botanist Carl Linnaeus and named in honour of the physician Giovanni Antonio Scopoli as Hyoscyamus scopolia. Nikolaus Joseph von Jacquin classified it to the genus Scopolia. The specific name carniolica signifies 'of Carniola', a historical region that comprised parts of modern-day Slovenia (see also Duchy of Carniola and March of Carniola).

Scopolia carniolica is the symbol of the Slovene Society of Anaesthesiology and Intensive Care Medicine. The plant is a source of scopolamine, which was used as an anesthetic in the past.

It is native to Austria, the Baltic States, Czechoslovakia, Hungary, Italy, North Caucasus, Poland, Romania, Transcaucasus, Ukraine, Yugoslavia.

== Use in folk medicine and criminal poisoning ==
The plant was used in the late Middle Ages as a narcotic agent and an ingredient in 'love potions' – a practice frequently resulting in fatal cases of poisoning. Furthermore, in its native Carpathians, Scopolia carniolica was also used with criminal intent, either to stupefy victims in order to rob them, or to kill them outright. It has also been used throughout Europe as a medicinal plant.

== Decline in traditional knowledge concerning plant in Slovenia ==
Fatur and Kreft note, in their recent article on the survival of folk knowledge concerning hallucinogenic Solanaceae in Slovenia, that S. carniolica is - ironically - now the least-remembered of such plants in its native land (Atropa, Hyoscyamus and Datura spp. all being better-known there), although they do record some information of interest regarding apotropaic uses of the plant in this part of its home range. Like the other Solanaceeous genera involved, Scopolia - once popular in the Pre-Christian and folkloric practices of pre-industrial Europe as a potent evoker of highly realistic and often frightening hallucinations - has been largely eclipsed in modern times by various less toxic hallucinogens (notably psilocybin-containing fungal species) evoking more lucid ASCs accompanied by fewer unpleasant side-effects (e.g. dry mouth, racing heartbeat and prolonged blurred vision caused by dilated pupils). Tropane-containing Solanaceae such as S. carniolica are, properly speaking, toxic, anticholinergic deliriants rather than ‘true hallucinogens’ and their frequently unpleasant and unpredictable effects can, on occasion, involve fatalities. One of Fatur and Kreft’s Slovenian informants vouchsafed the information that certain individuals wore the leaves of S. carniolica (local name krajnska bunika) tied around their waists in order to ward off evil spirits. Another stated that they knew of a couple of cases in which people had taken the plant for its hallucinogenic effects and had, as a result, ended up spending time recovering from their foolhardy experimentation in psychiatric hospitals.

== Gallery ==
=== S. carniolica ===
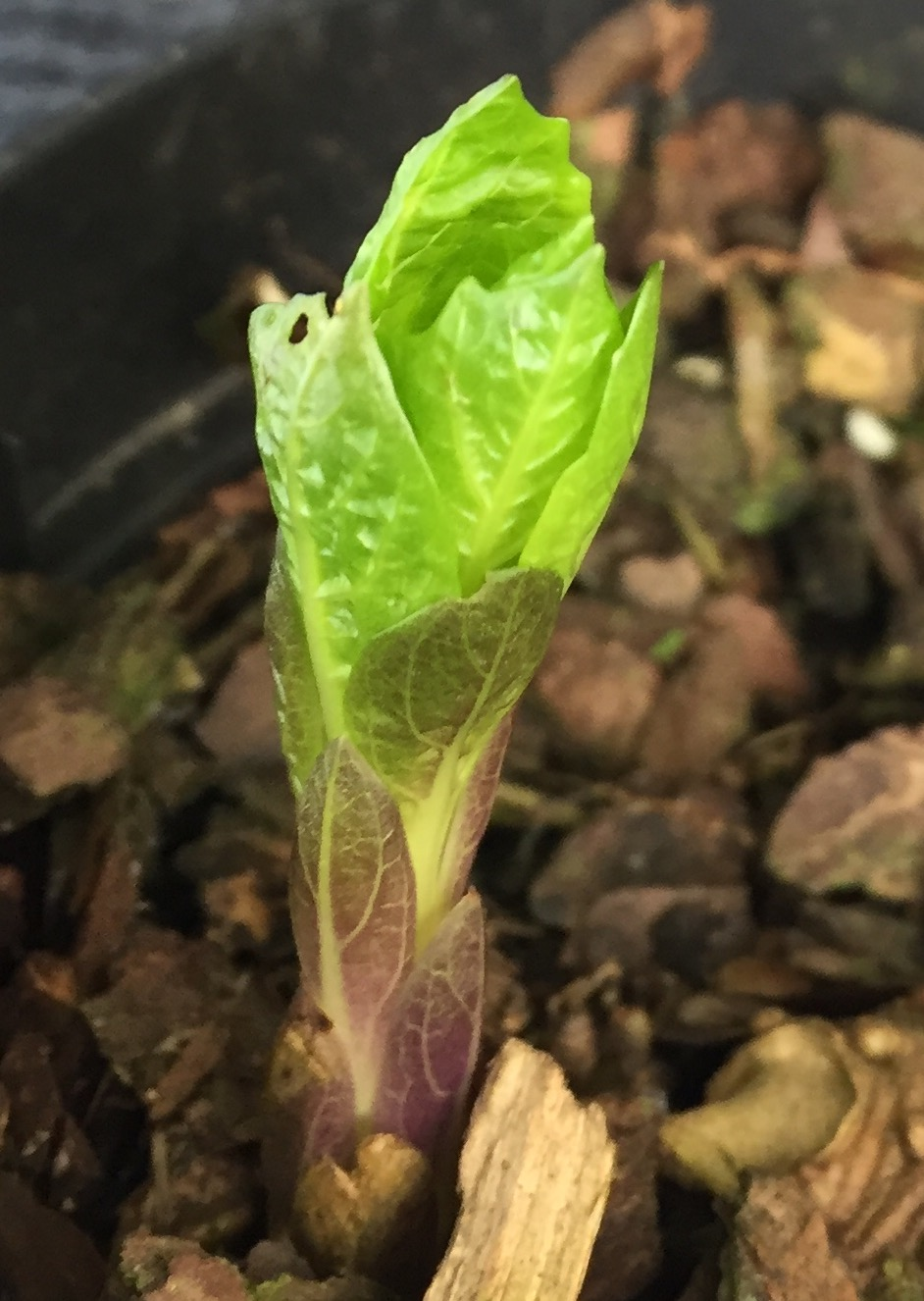
Scopolia carniolica Jacq. Young shoot sprouting: scale leaves pigmented purple: adult leaves somewhat dentate.

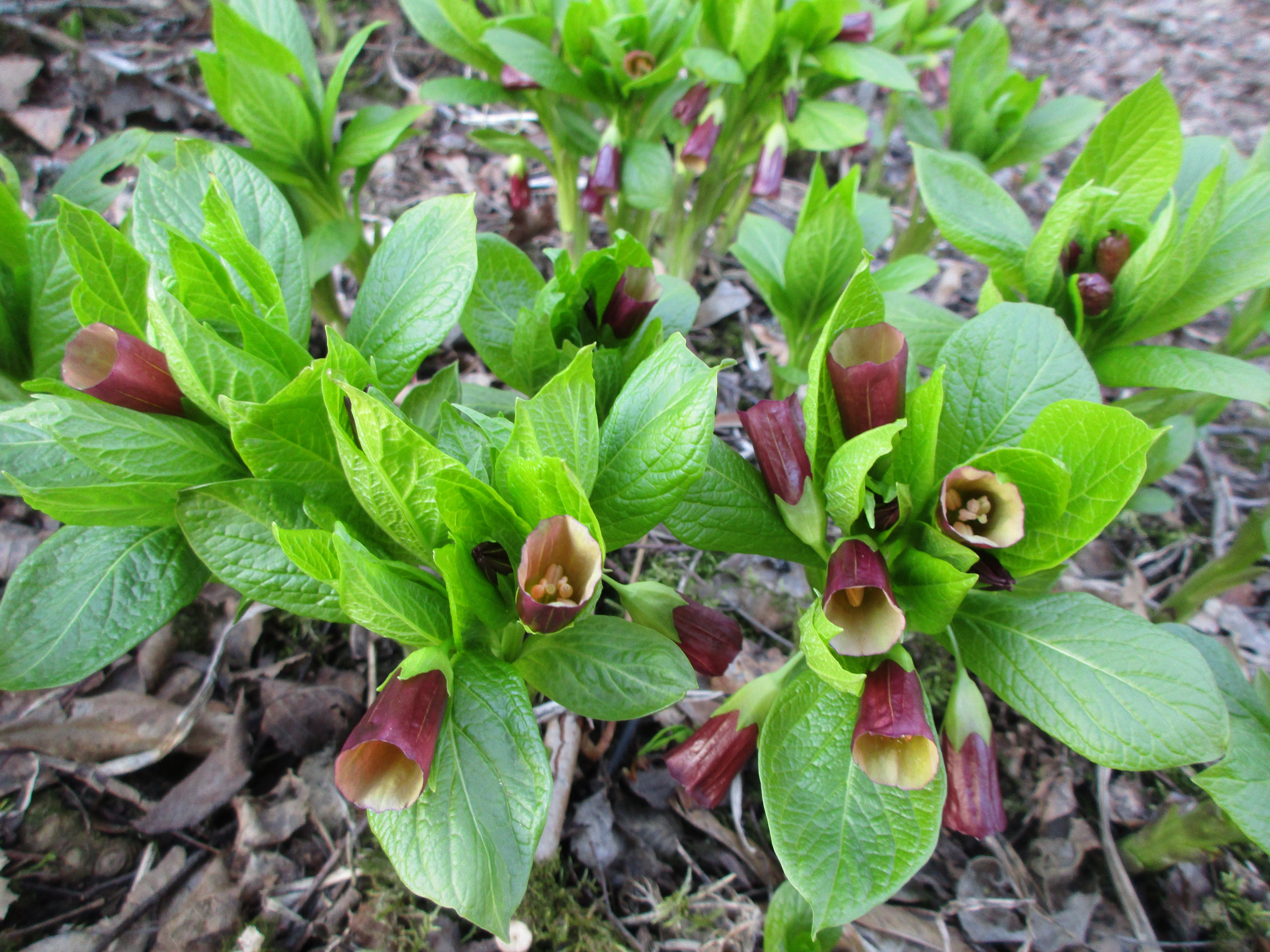
Fresh young foliage and abundant flowers of a mature specimen in Spring. Cultivated plant, arboretum in southern Finland.

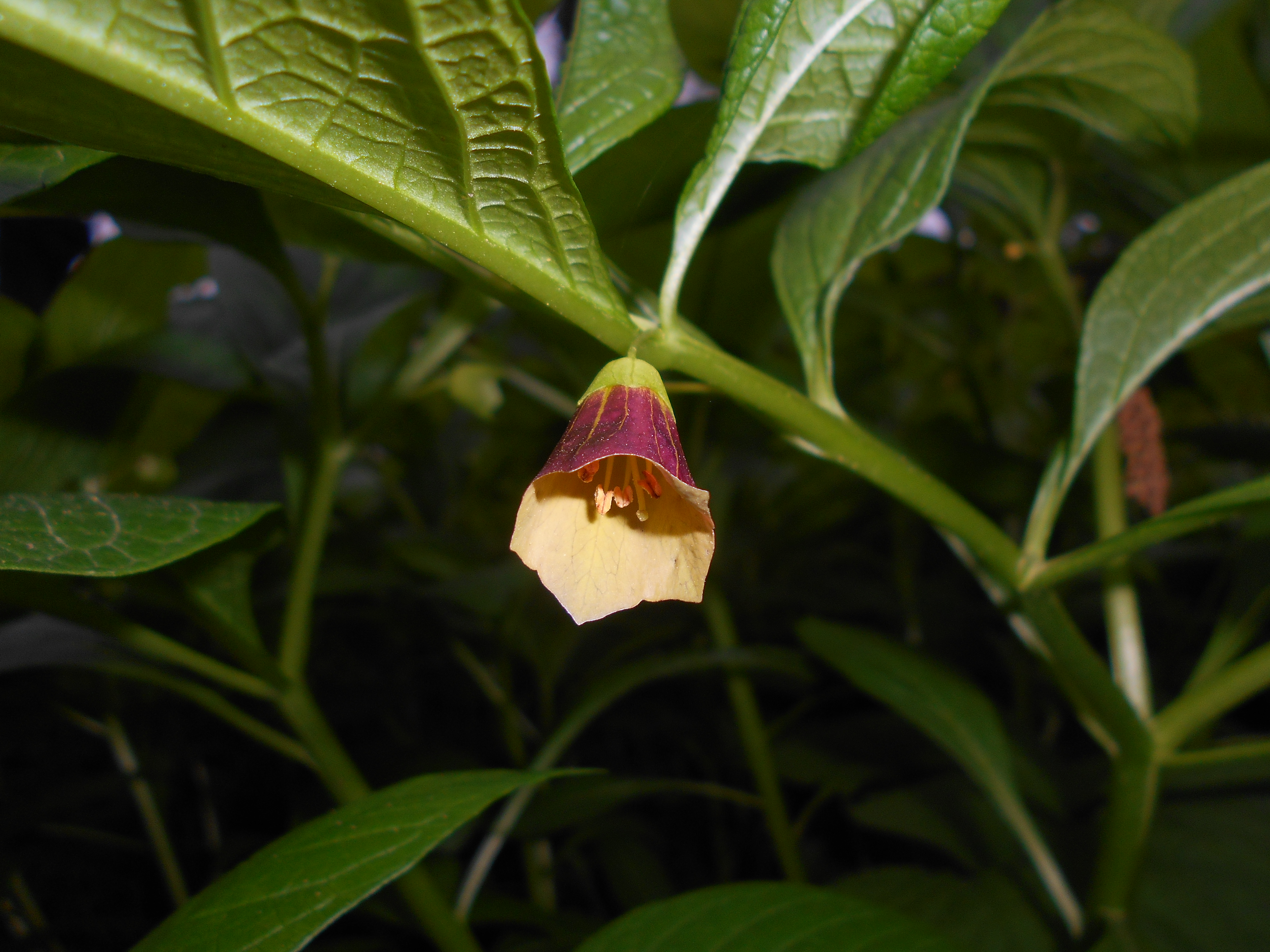
Flower and leaves viewed from beneath, UMCS Botanical Garden in Lublin Poland

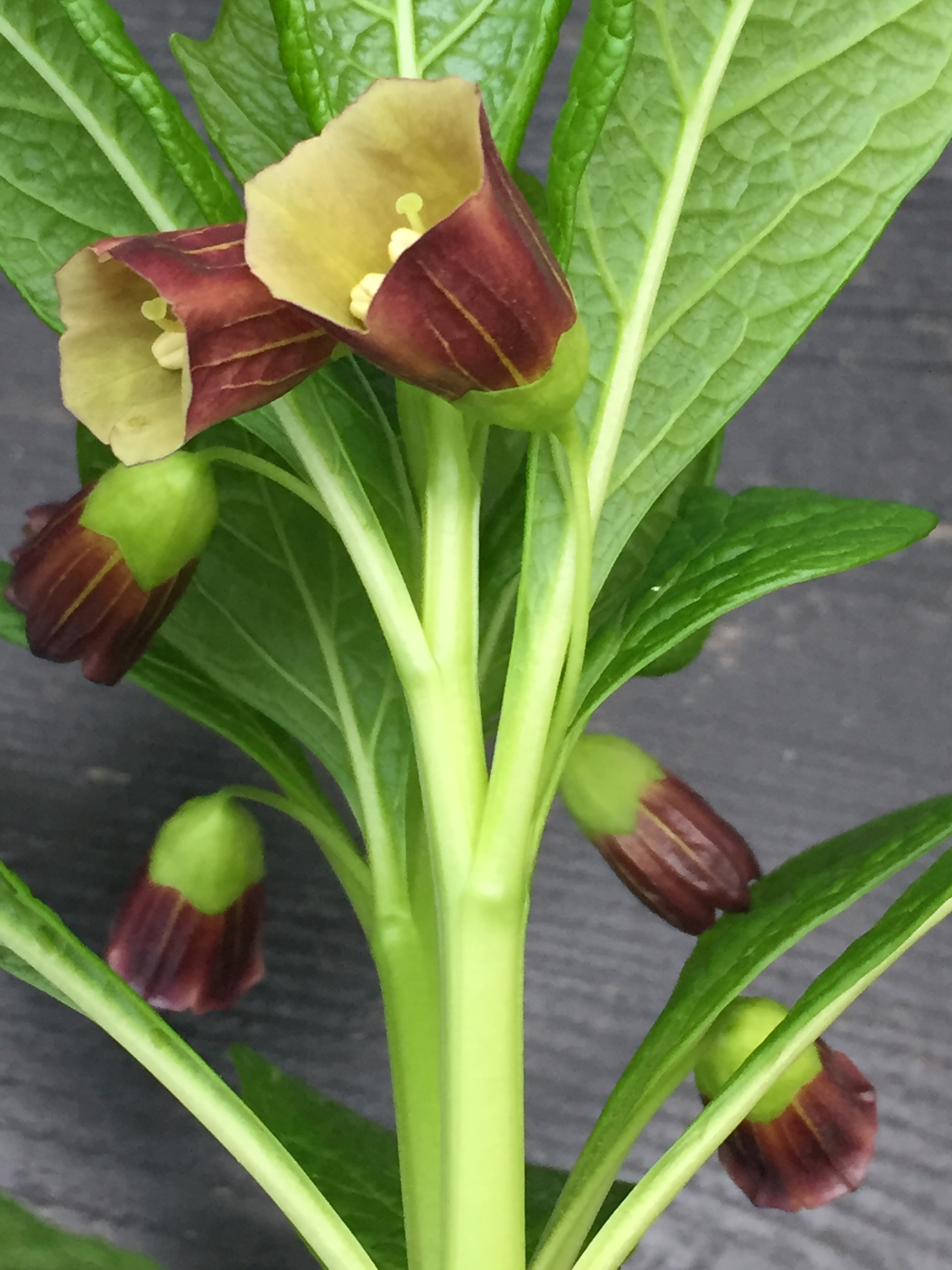
Scopolia carniolica Jacq. Young flowering shoot. Cultivated plant.

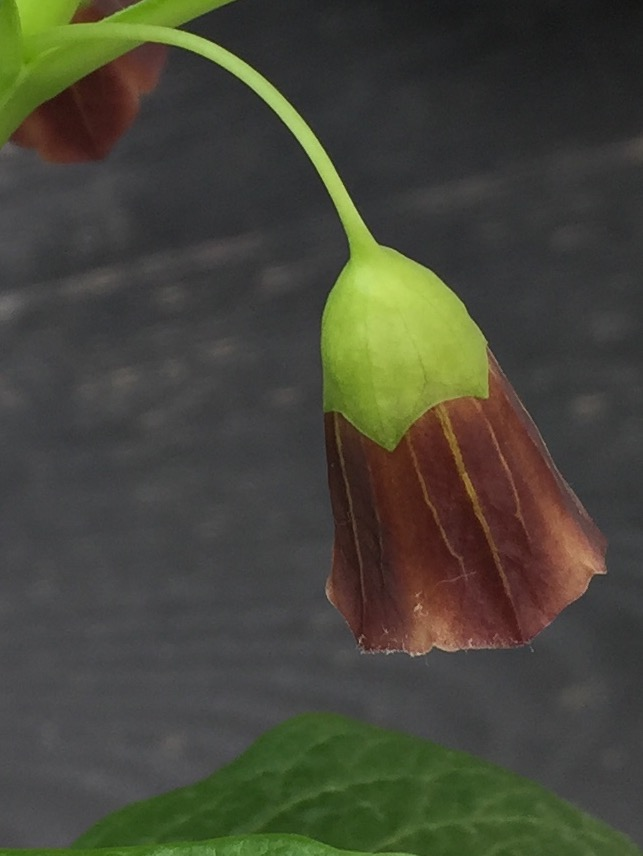
Scopolia carniolica Jacq. Single flower, showing long, slender pedicel and cup-like calyx.

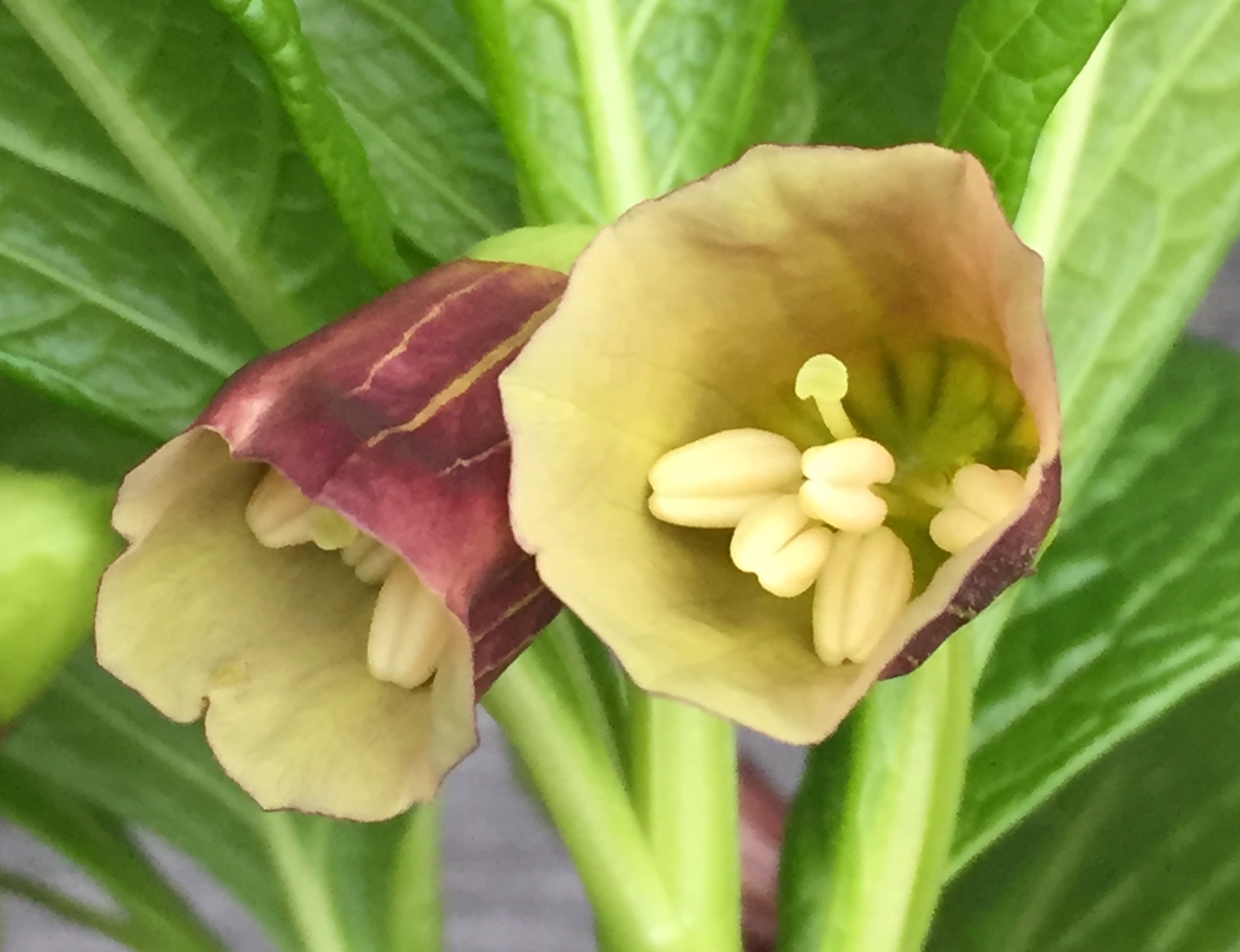
Scopolia carniolica Jacq. Flowers, enlarged, showing cream interior with green reticulation and unripe anthers.

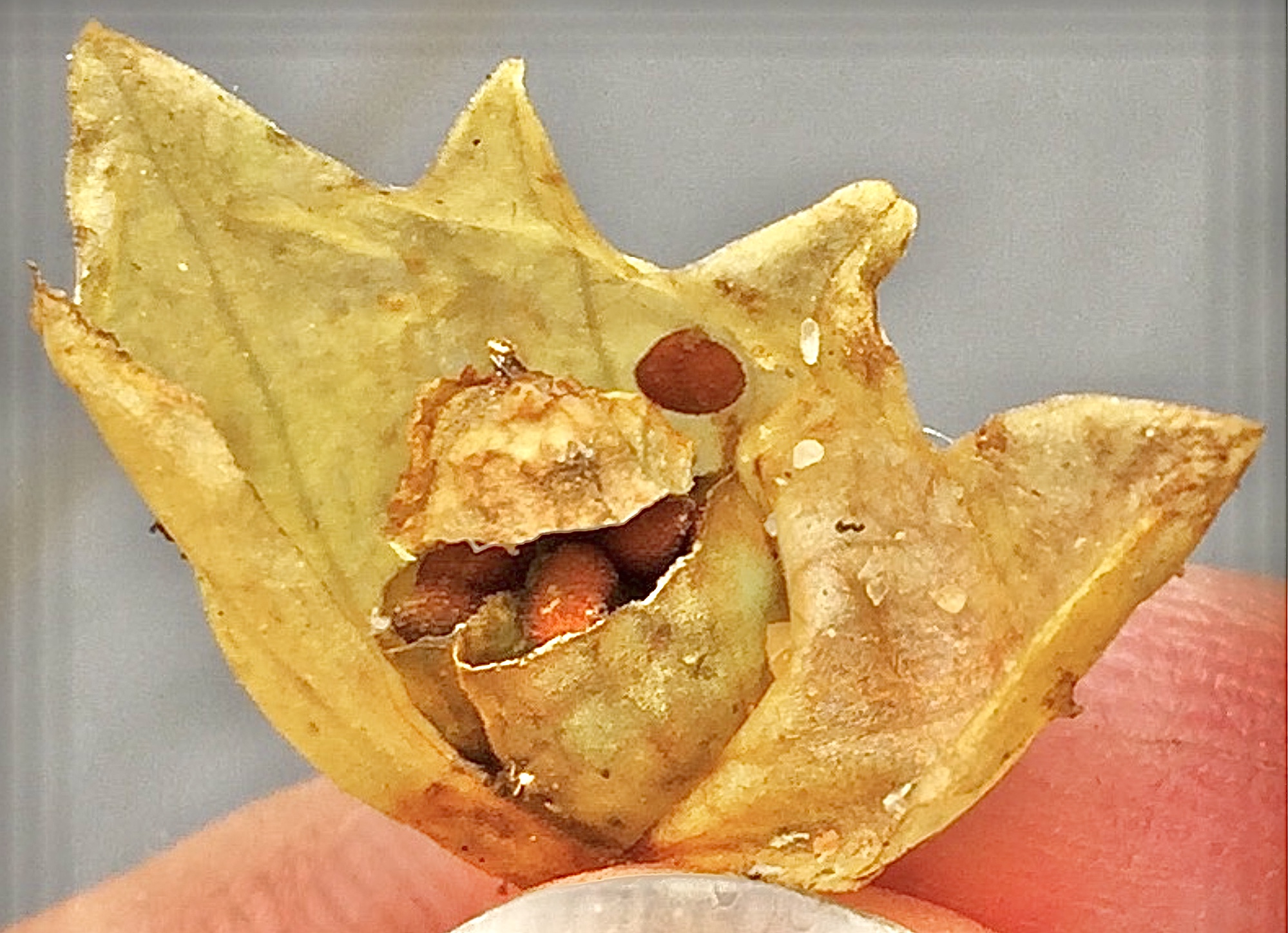
Scopolia carniolica Jacq. fruiting calyx dissected to reveal pyxidium within, dehiscing by operculum to reveal ripe, pitted brown seeds within.

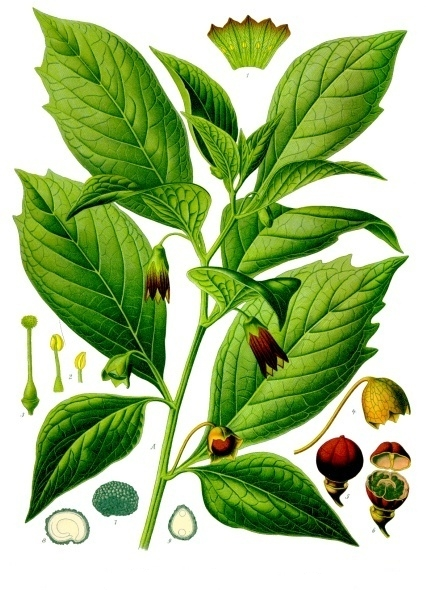
Coloured plate, nominally of
S. carniolica,
but resembling
S. caucasica.
Köhler’s Medizinal-Pflanzen.

=== S. carniolica f. hladnikiana ===
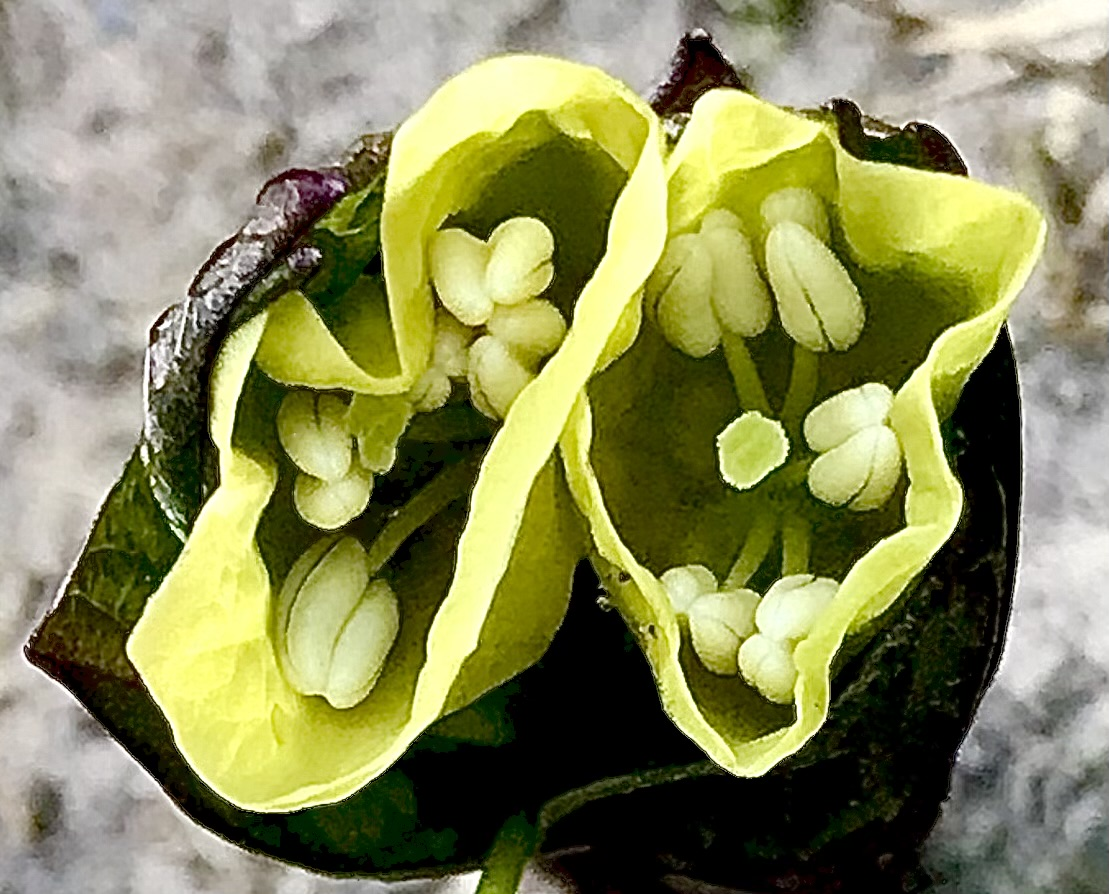
Two upward-facing flowers borne on newly-emerged shoot

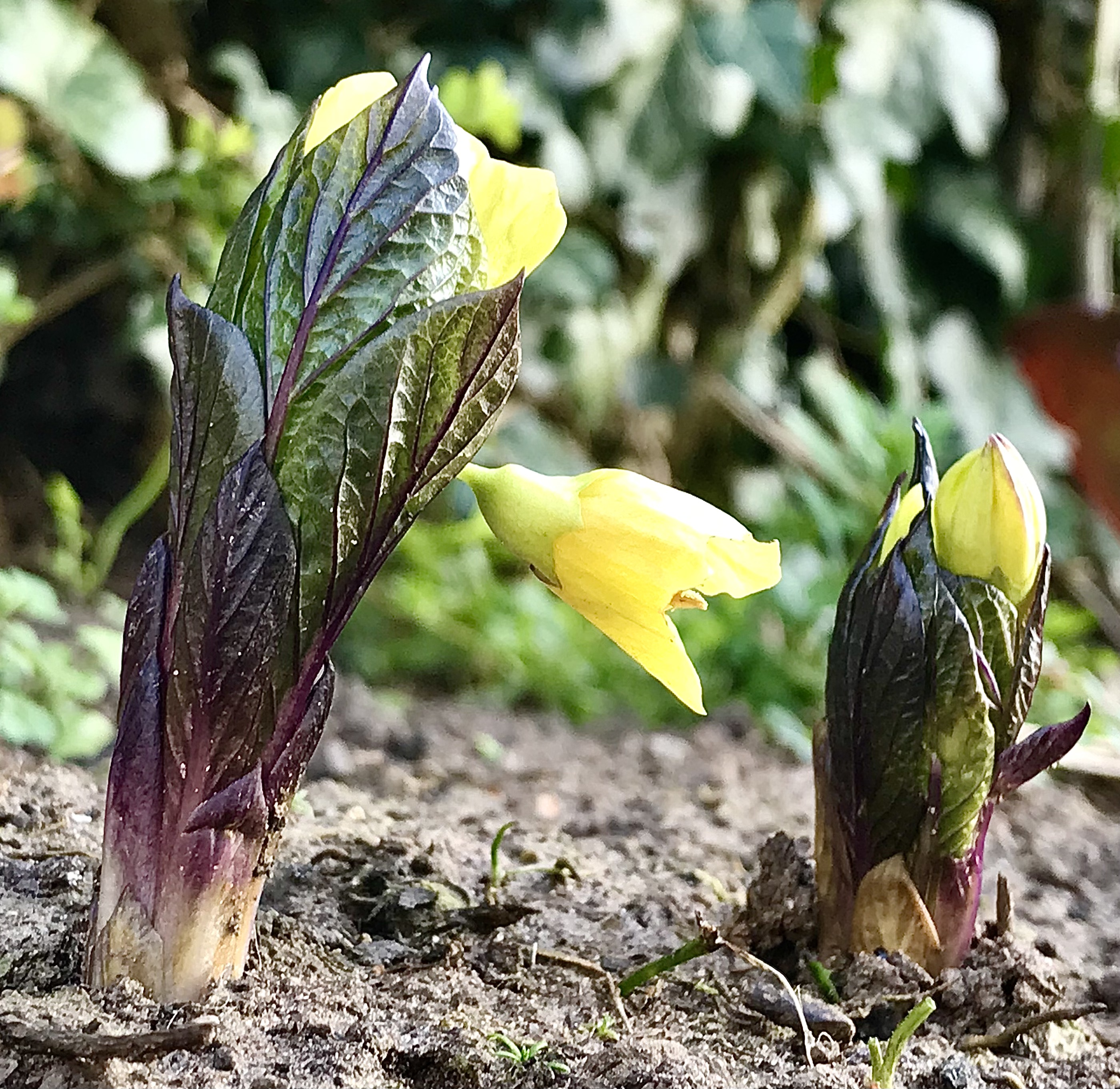
Young flowering shoots of a cultivated specimen

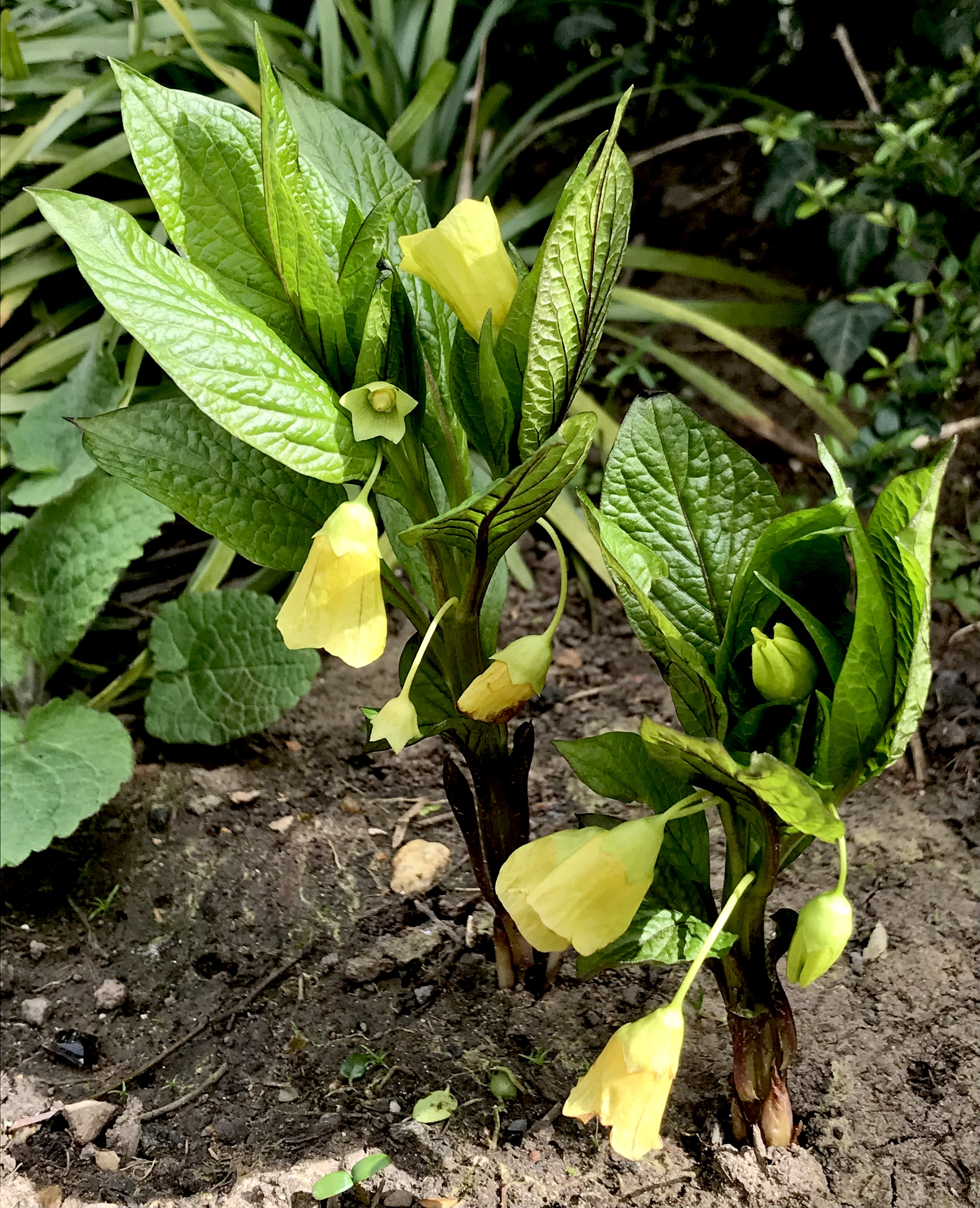
Same shoots, circa 2 weeks later, showing further development

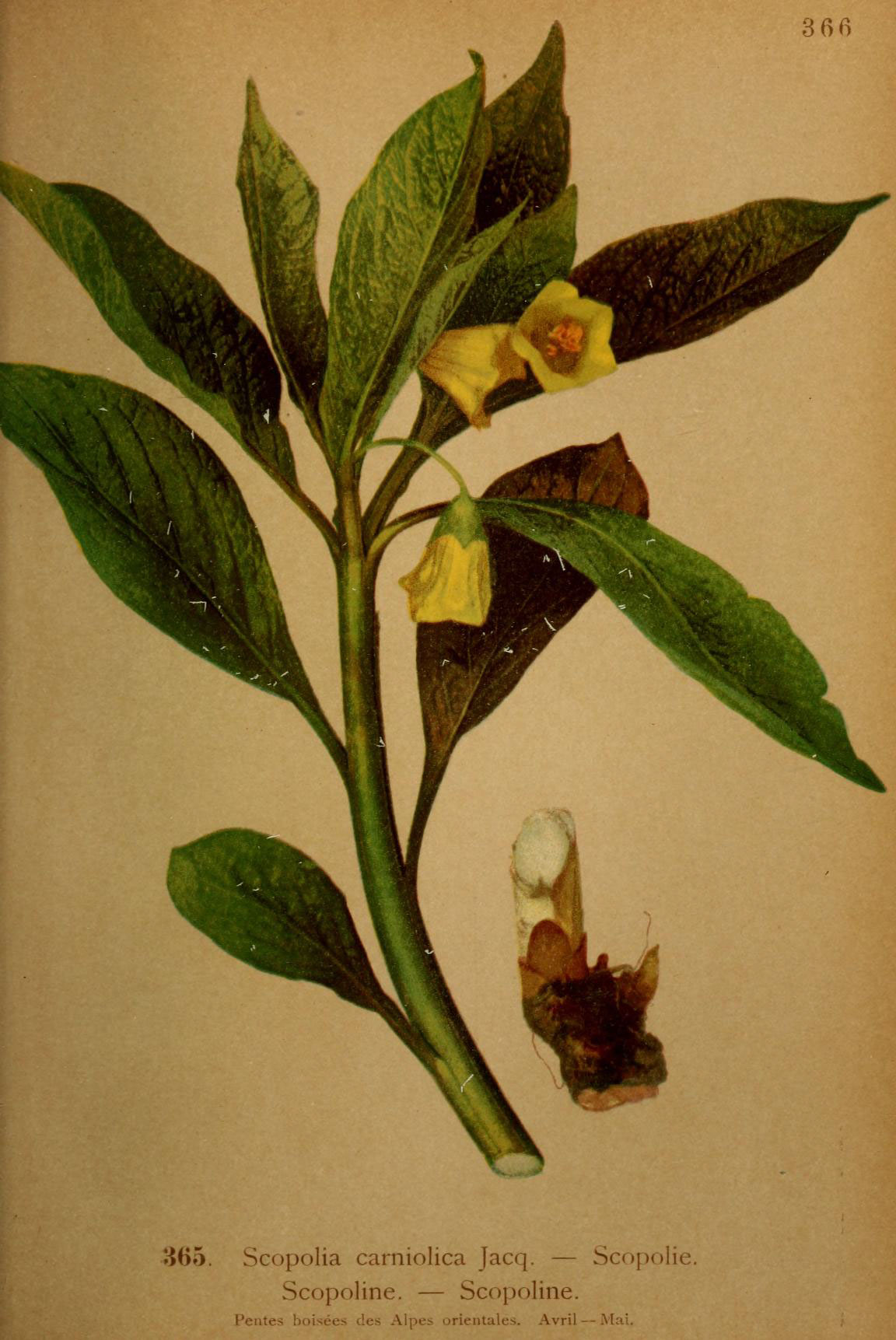
Scopolia carniolica (f. hladnikiana, though not described as such). Coloured plate, Atlas de la flora alpine (author: Henry Correvon)
