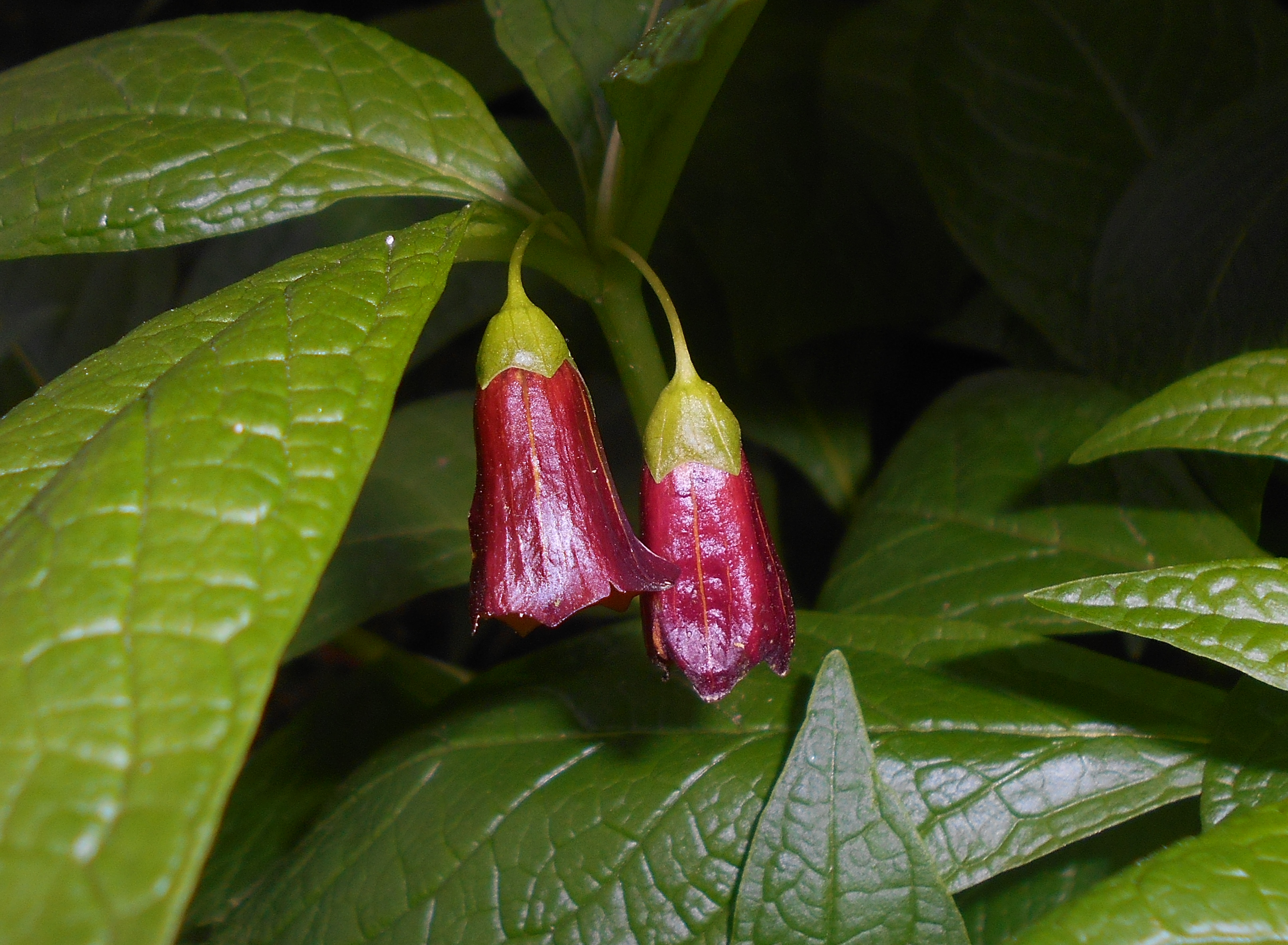
- Scopolia carniolica

Scientific classification
- Kingdom: Plantae
- Clade: Tracheophytes
- Clade: Angiosperms
- Clade: Eudicots
- Clade: Asterids
- Order: Solanales
- Family: Solanaceae
- Subfamily: Solanoideae
- Tribe: Hyoscyameae
- Genus: Scopolia; Lam.

Species
- Scopolia carniolica Scopolia caucasica Scopolia japonica Scopolia lutescens

= Scopolia =

Genus of flowering plants

Scopolia is a genus of four species of flowering plants in the family Solanaceae, native to Europe and Asia. The genus is named after Giovanni Scopoli (1723–88), a Tyrolean naturalist. The genus has a disjunct distribution, with two recognised species in Central to Eastern Europe, (including the Caucasus), and two species in East Asia. The two European species are:

- Scopolia carniolica Jacq. of Slovenia, Austria and the Carpathian Mountains
- Scopolia caucasica Kolesn. ex Kreyer of the Caucasus

and the two Asiatic species are:

- Scopolia lutescens Y.N. Lee of Korea
- Scopolia japonica Maxim. of Japan

The four species in the equally medicinal genus Anisodus

- Anisodus tanguticus (Maxim.) Pascher
- Anisodus luridus Link ex Spreng.
- Anisodus carniolicoides (C.Y.Wu & C.Chen) D'Arcy & Z.Y.Zhang
- Anisodus acutangulus C.Y.Wu & C.Chen

have in the past been placed in the genus Scopolia, as has the monotypic genus Atropanthe with its single species Atropanthe sinensis Pascher.

Scopolia carniolica - the longest-known species and the one with the westernmost distribution - is a creeping perennial plant, with light green leaves and dull reddish-purple flowers (cream-to-yellow in the attractive and more ornamental form hladnikiana, sometimes cultivated as a decorative plant). Extract of Scopolia (which contains a form of the alkaloid scopolamine) is used in at least one commercial stomach remedy (Inosea, produced by Sato Pharmaceutical). The extract is an anti-spasmodic in low doses and may be used to relax smooth muscle tissue or prevent motion-sickness-induced nausea; in higher doses, it is a poison having hallucinogenic and memory-inhibiting effects.

Other alkaloids found in Scopolia carniolica include cuscohygrine, hyoscyamine, and atroscine.

The coumarin phenylpropanoids umbelliferone and scopoletin have been isolated from the roots of Scopolia japonica.

== Comparison of Scopolia carniolica with Atropa belladonna ==
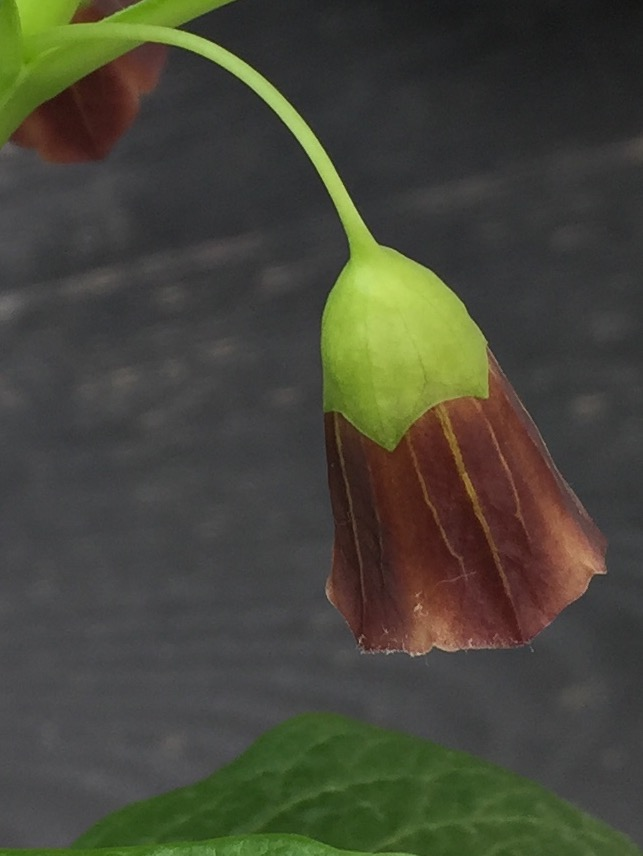
Single flower of Scopolia carniolica, showing hairless, cup-shaped, only faintly-lobed calyx and cream-veined, purple-brown corolla

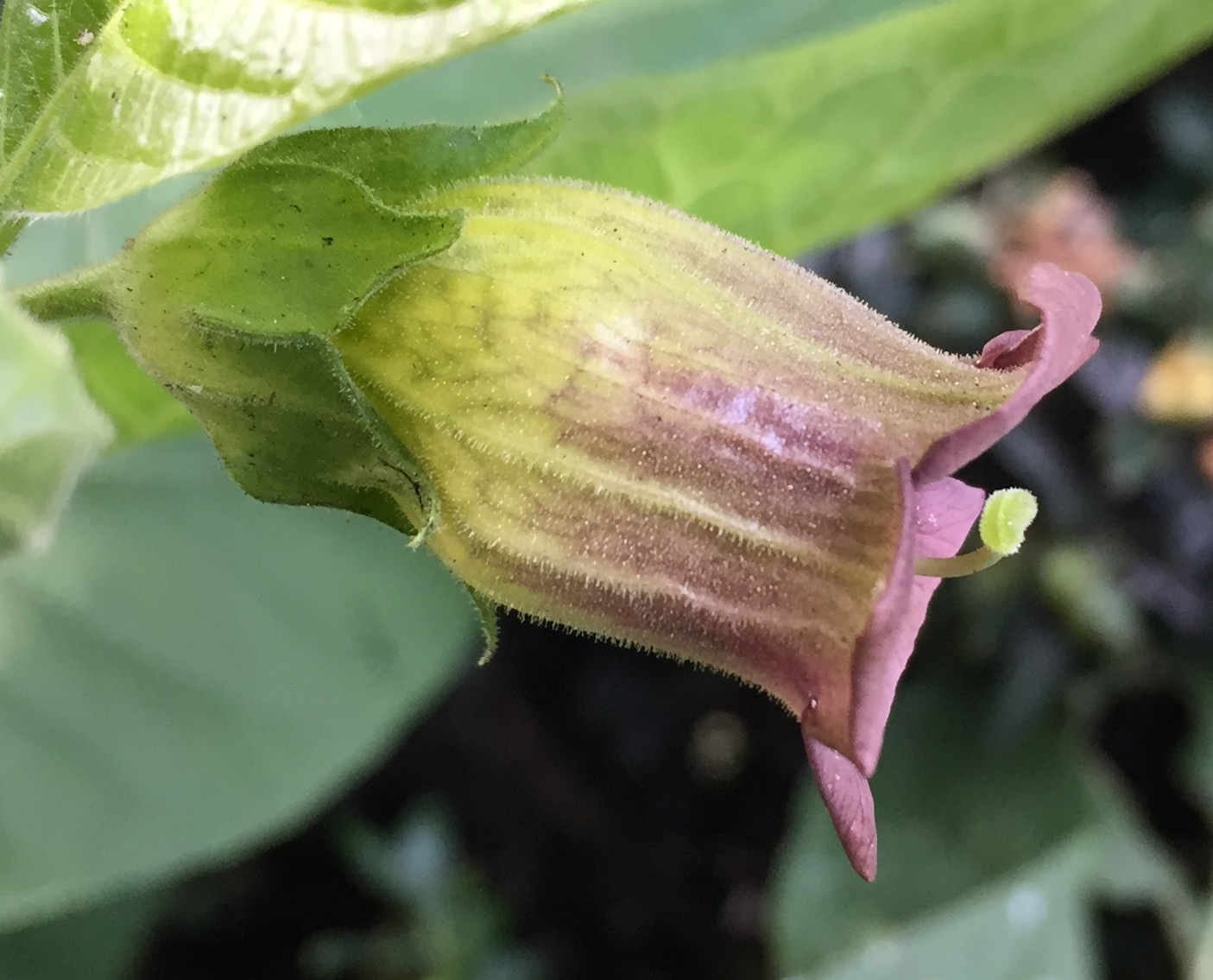
Single flower of Atropa belladonna, showing hairy, lobed calyx and hairy, purple and green, urn-shaped corolla, netted with veins. Note curved pistil (bearing minutely hairy stigma) protruding beyond corolla.

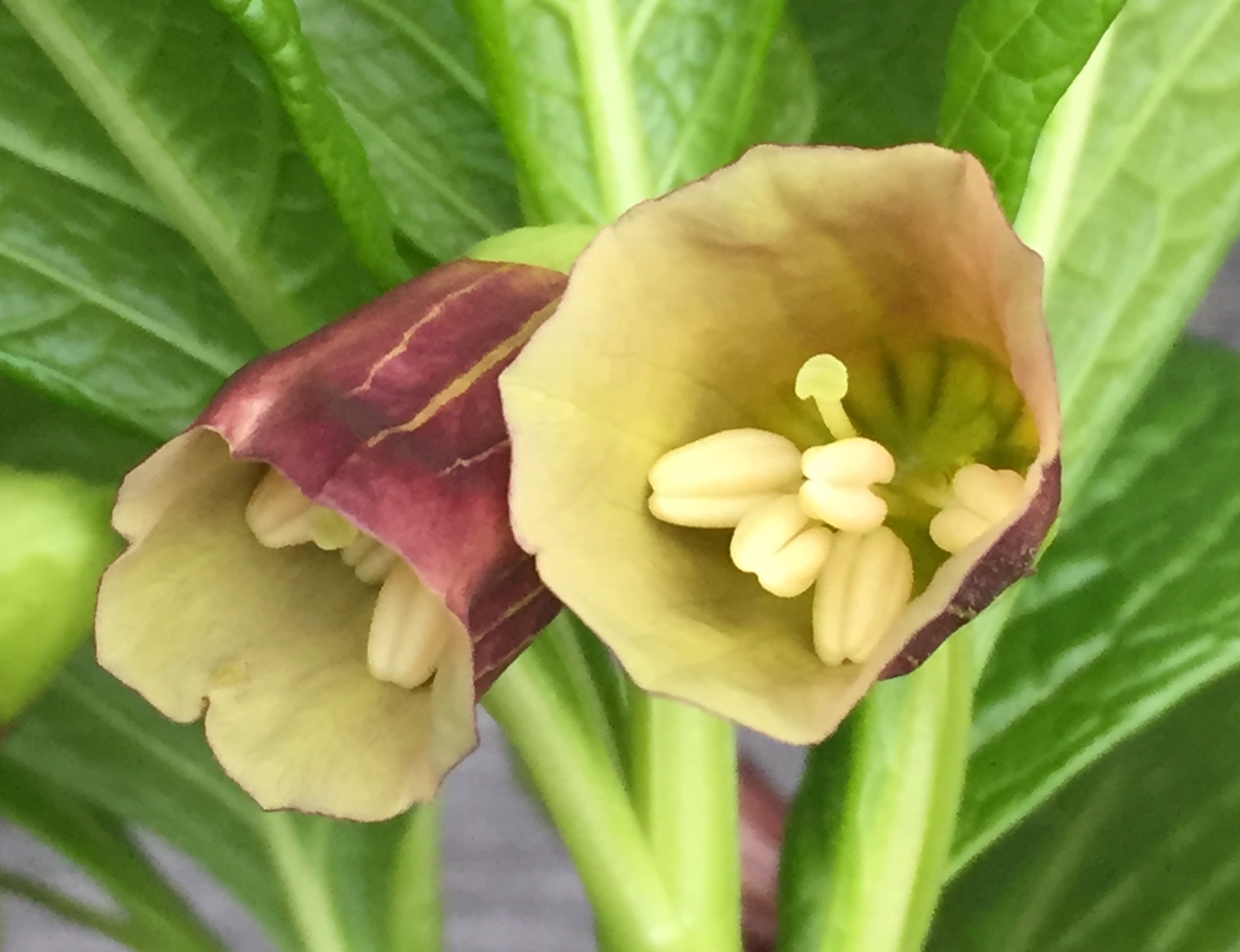
Close up of cream-coloured interiors of two flowers of Scopolia carniolica (some dark venation visible at very bases of flowers)

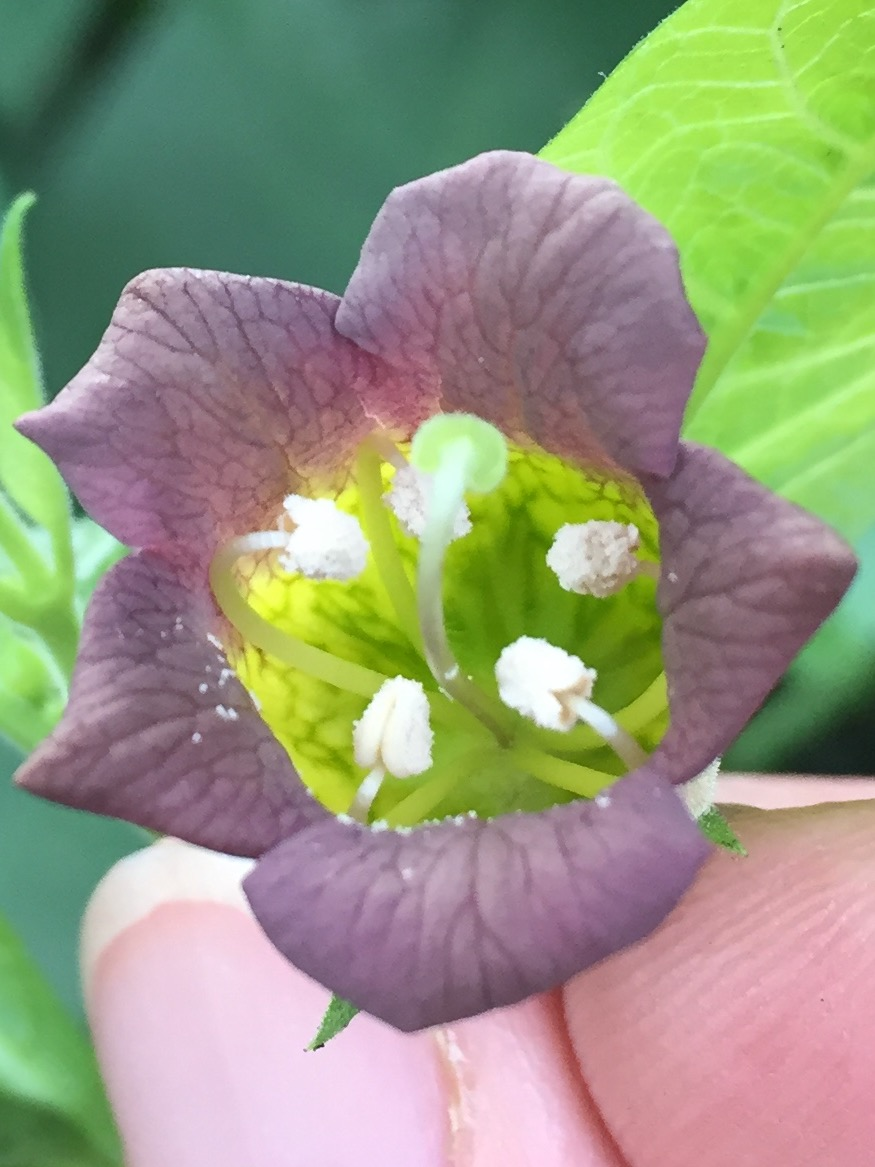
Close-up of purple and green interior, netted with veins, of single flower of Atropa belladonna. Note stamens curling inward towards mouth of flower.

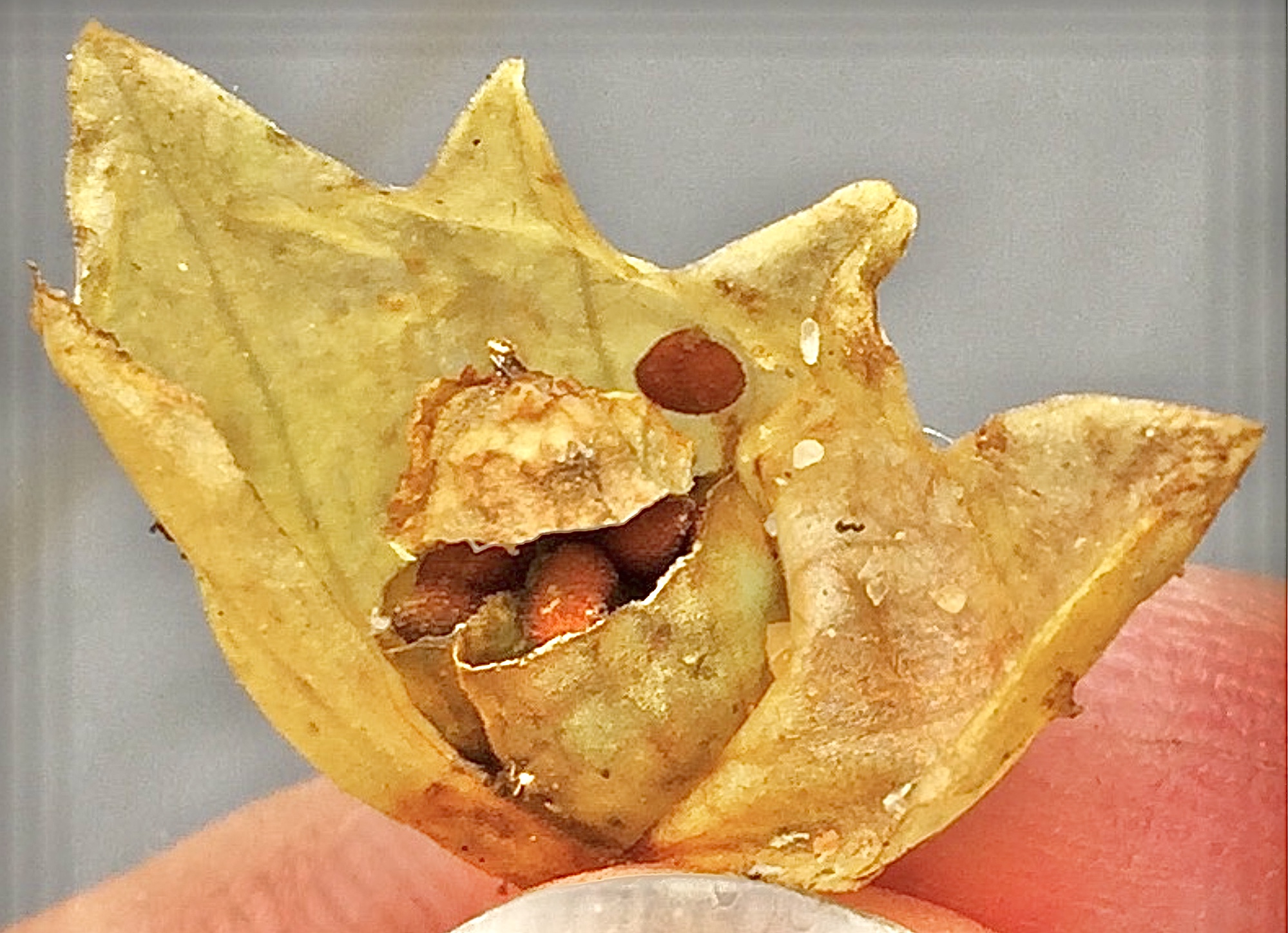
Scopolia carniolica fruit with cup-shaped calyx slit to reveal pyxidium (dry capsule dehiscing by operculum (= lid) to reveal seeds)

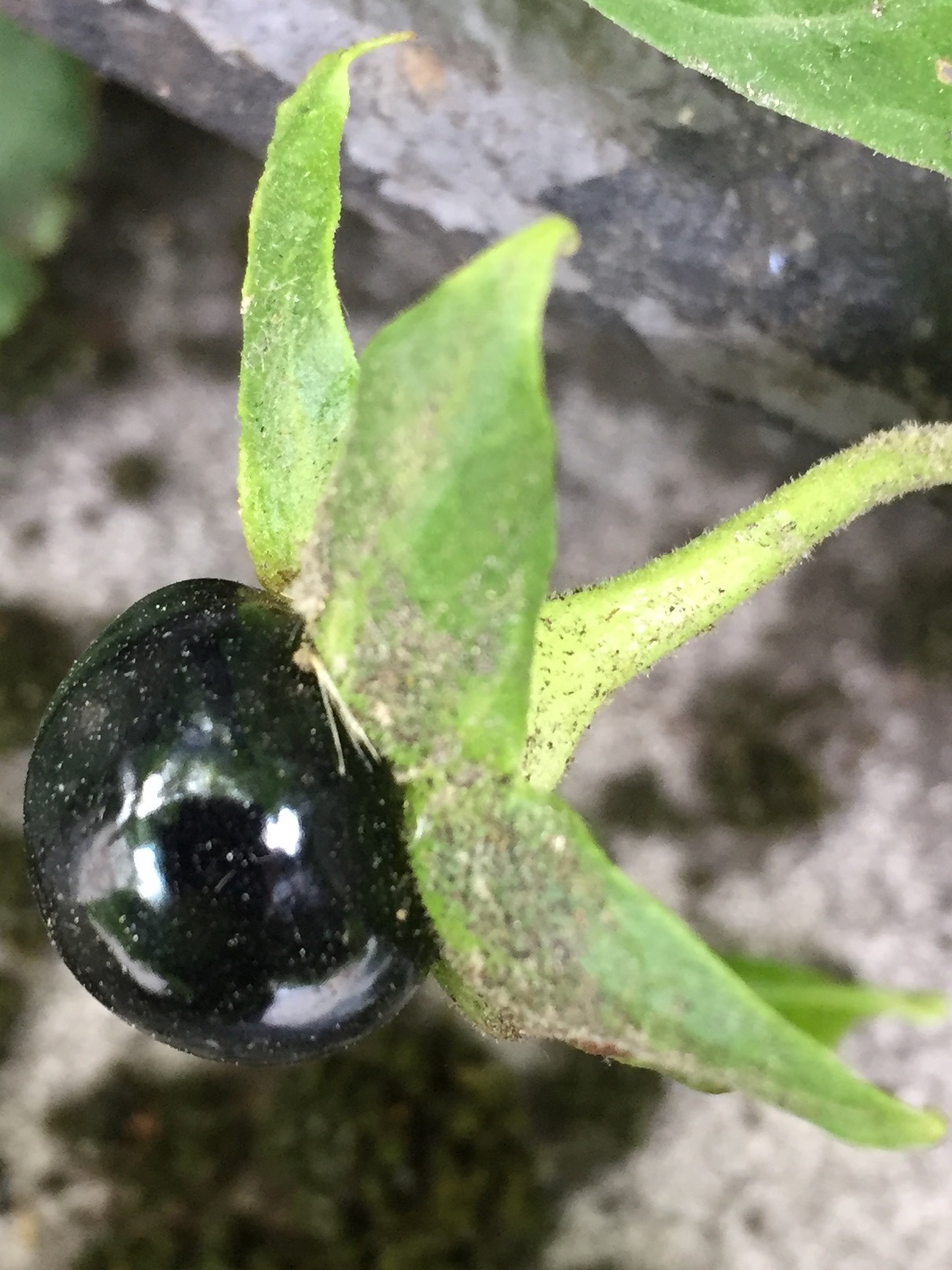
Atropa belladonna indehiscent fruit: glossy, juicy berry with distinctly lobed, star-shaped calyx

The existence of the synonym Scopolia atropoides (i.e. "Atropa-like Scopolia") for Scopolia carniolica demonstrates the perceived similarity between Scopolia carniolica and its better-known relative Deadly Nightshade (Atropa belladonna). The most obvious dissimilarity lies in the respective fruits, that of Scopolia being a pyxidium (i.e. a dry, pot-like capsule with an operculum (lid)) while that of Atropa is a juicy, glistening, jet-black berry bearing a superficial resemblance to a cherry - indeed this pyxidium / berry dichotomy constitutes the feature separating the genus Atropa into a subtribe of its own within the Solanaceous tribe Hyoscyameae: all other genera in tribe Hyoscyameae have the same type of dry, pyxidial capsule as Scopolia. Other points of dissimilarity include:

- Pedicel type: Scopolia carniolica, long, slender and delicate / Atropa belladonna, shorter and broadening toward the calyx - particularly at fruiting.
- Calyx type: Scopolia carniolica, cup-shaped, with slight peaks rather than distinct lobes / Atropa belladonna distinctly lobed, the individual lobes somewhat leaf-like and these lobes spreading to make the calyx star-shaped in fruit.
- Colour of corolla: Scopolia carniolica, exterior: purplish-brown striped longitudinally with cream veins, interior: cream, except for some dark venation at the very base / Atropa belladonna, dull purple shading to green netted with darker veins at the base.
- Glabrescence / pubescence: Scopolia carniolica, glabrous (hairless), the corolla often having a glossy, "enameled" appearance / Atropa belladonna pubescent (hairy), the corolla and calyx being clothed in short trichomes (hairs) - though less so in those of its eastern subspecies A. belladonna ssp. caucasica.
- Corolla shape: Scopolia carniolica, simple, un-lobed, straight-sided bell / Atropa belladonna urceolate (= urn-shaped) bell bearing short but distinct lobes, somewhat recurved.
- Pistil: Scopolia carniolica, straight and shorter than corolla / Atropa belladonna, curved and exserted (=protruding beyond corolla).

== Gallery ==
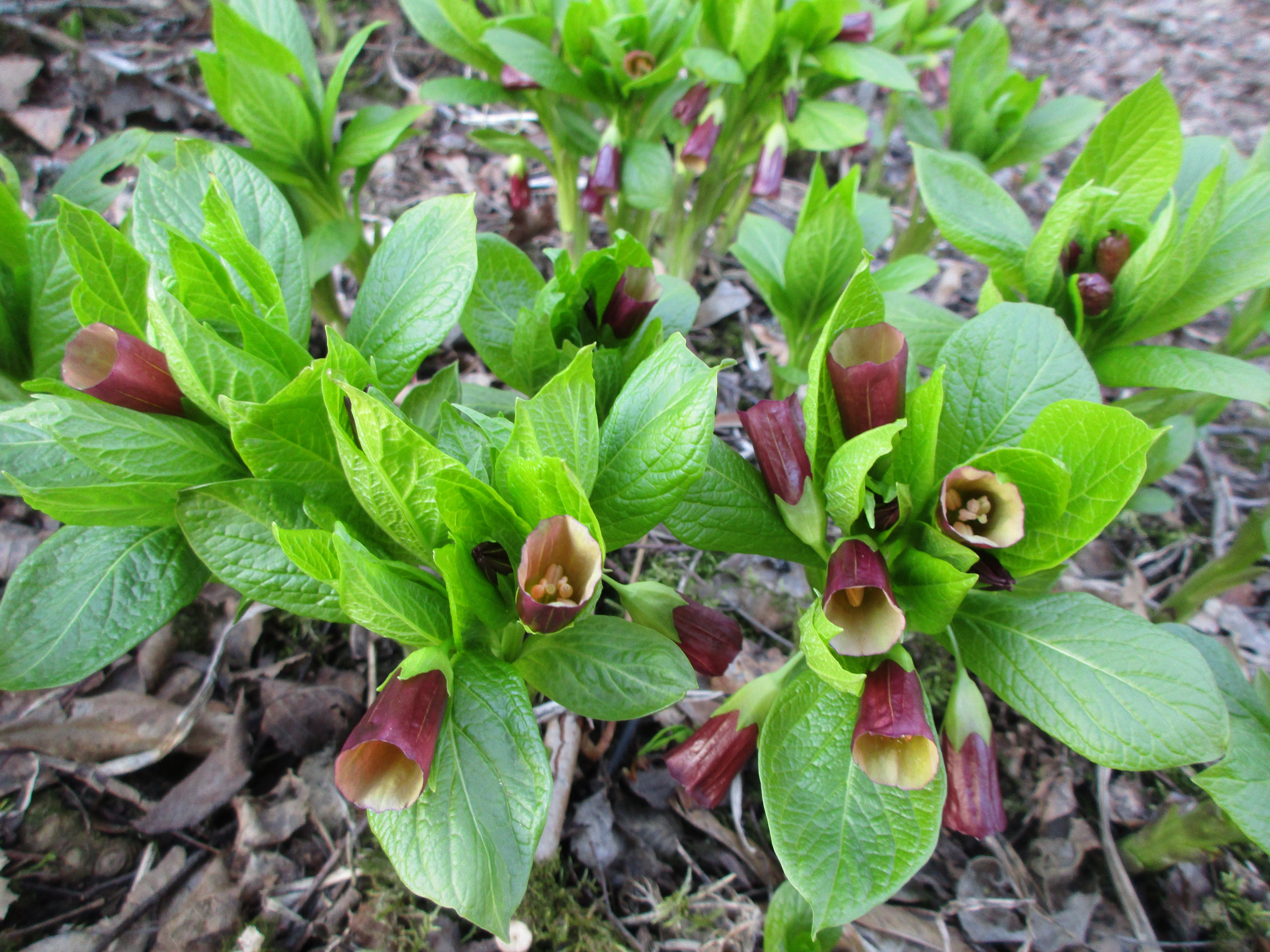
Scopolia carniolica fresh Spring growth with abundant flowers, old arboretum, Finland.

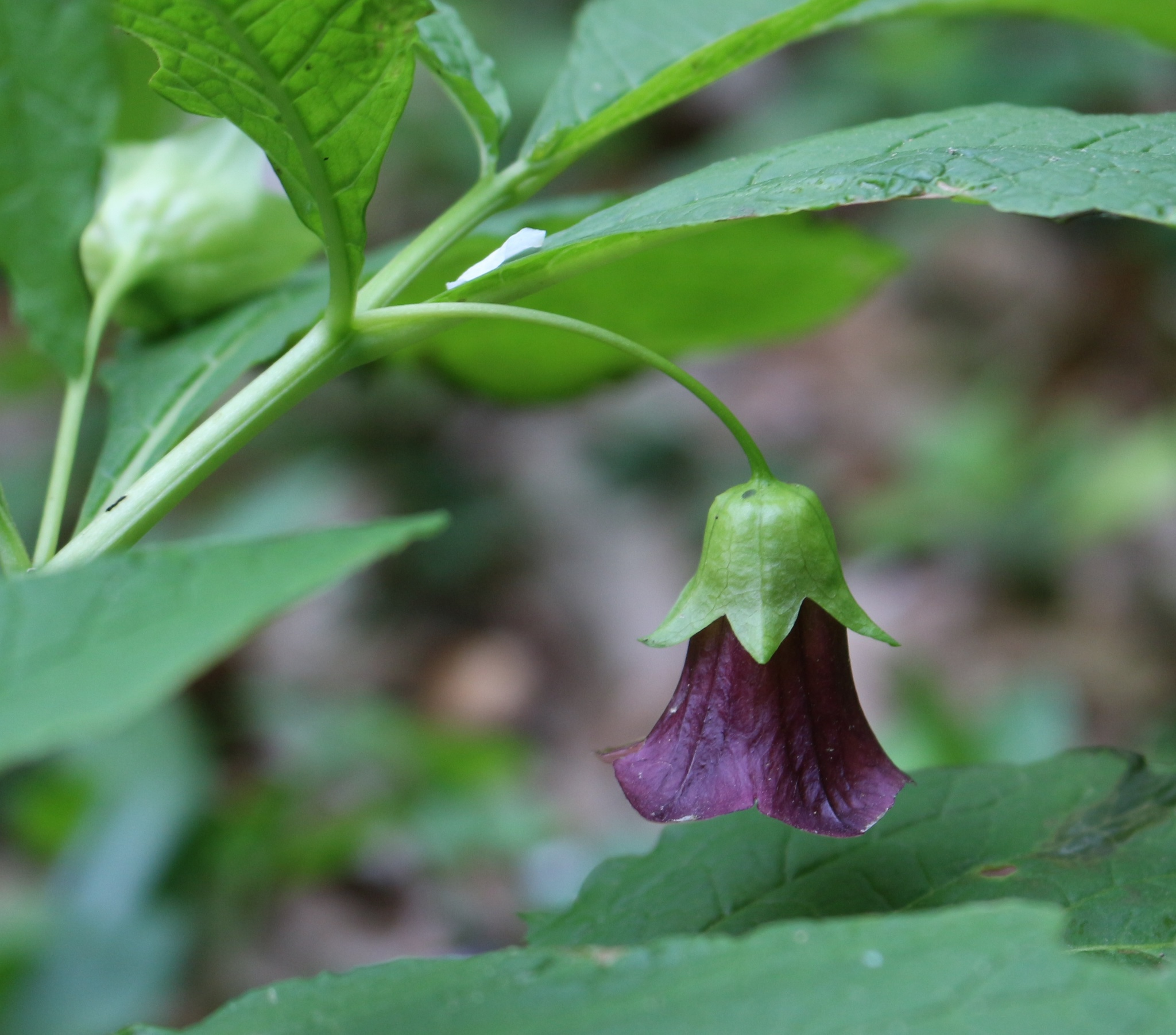
Scopolia caucasica in flower, showing distinctive corolla shape - more flared than in other species

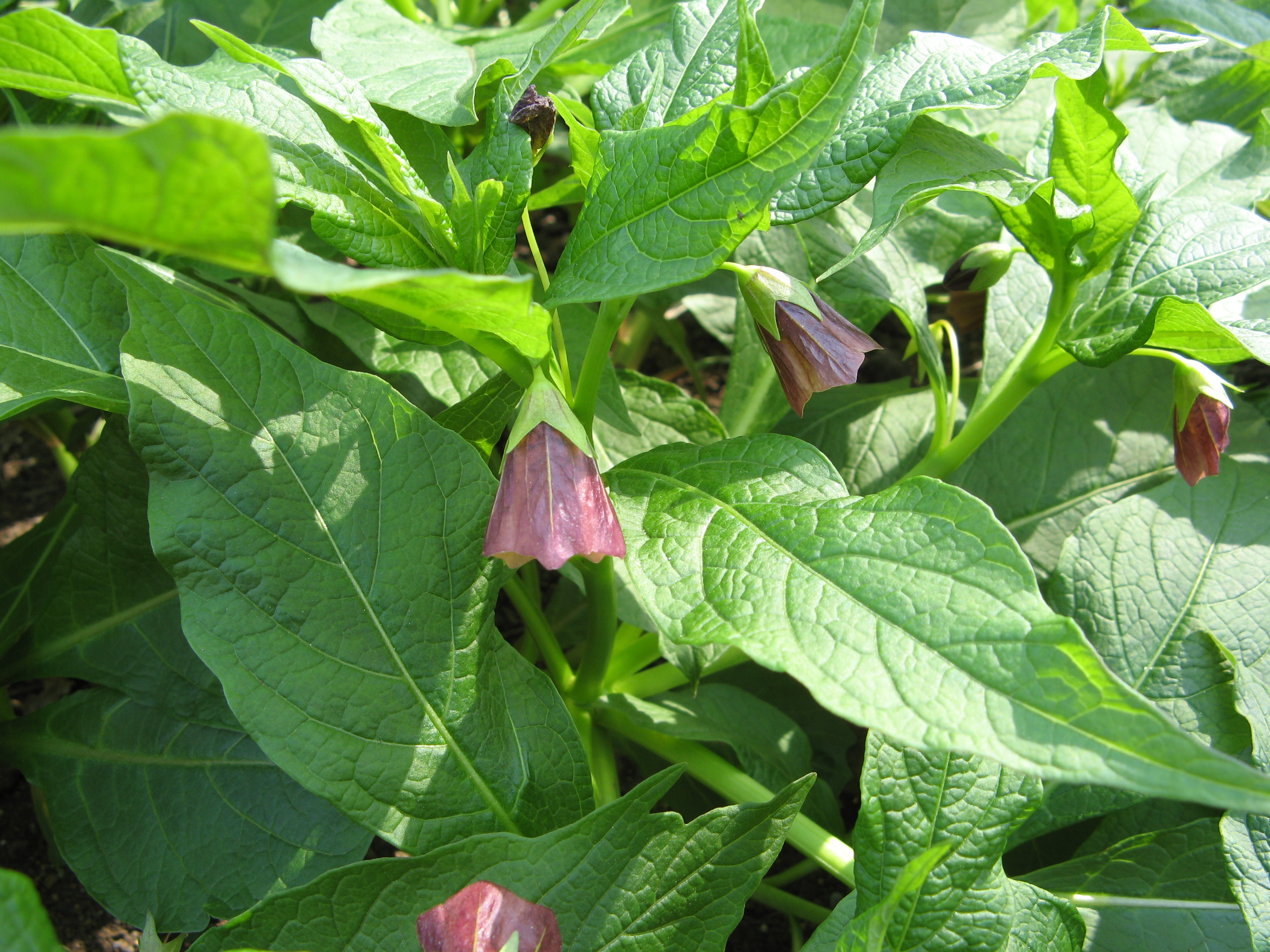
Scopolia japonica (Common name in Japanese: 走りどころ Hashiri-dokoro), plant in flower, Korea.

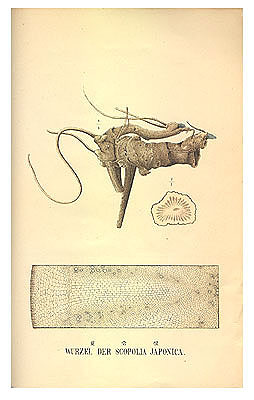
Scopoliae Rhizoma (root of Scopolia japonica)
