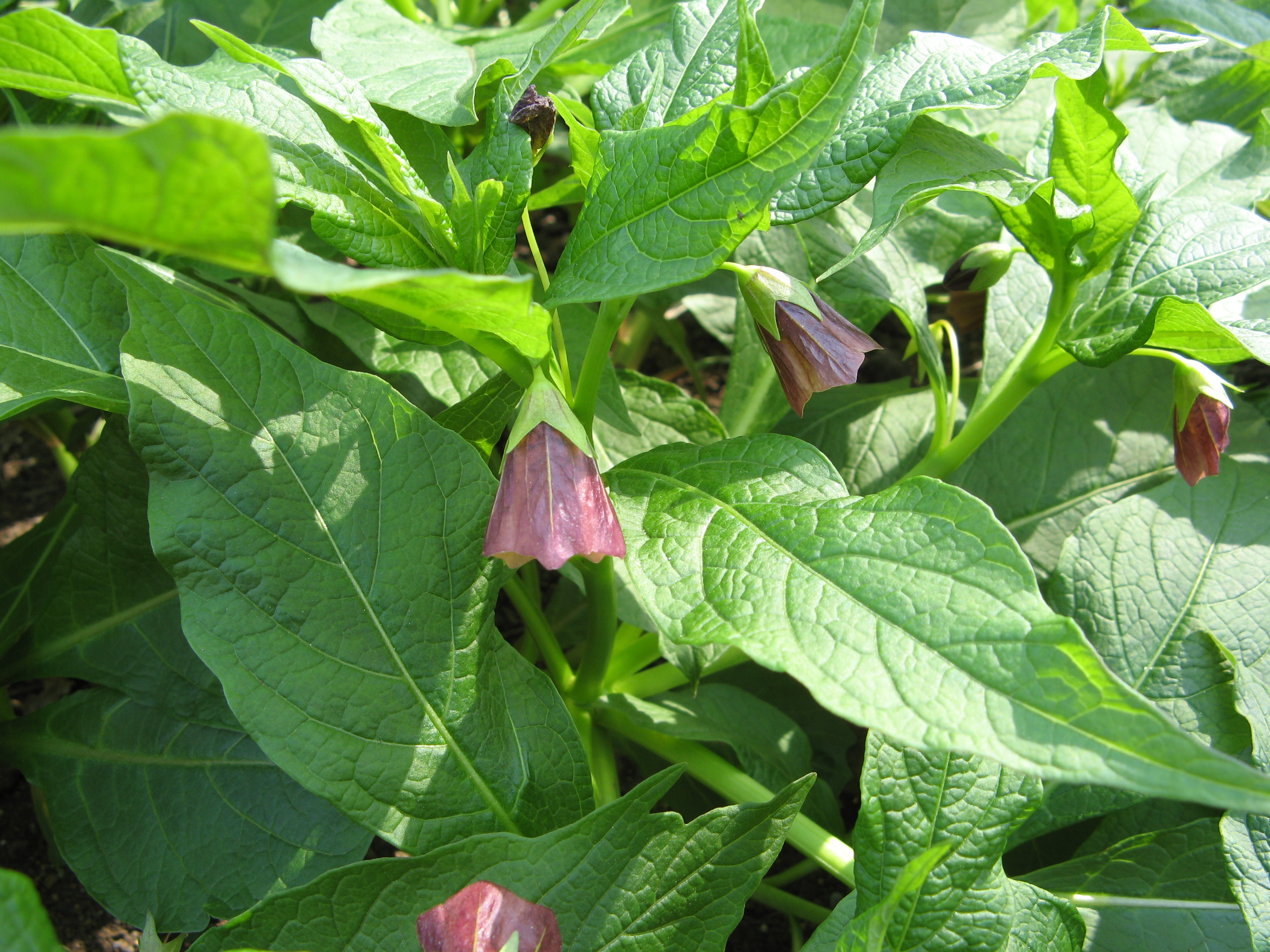

Scientific classification
- Kingdom: Plantae
- Clade: Tracheophytes
- Clade: Angiosperms
- Clade: Eudicots
- Clade: Asterids
- Order: Solanales
- Family: Solanaceae
- Genus: Scopolia
- Species: S. japonica

Binomial name
- Scopolia japonica Maxim.

= Scopolia japonica =

Species of flowering plant

Scopolia japonica, also Japanese belladonna or Korean scopolia, is a flowering plant species in the genus Scopolia - one of the eight genera in tribe Hyoscyameae of the nightshade family Solanaceae.

The coumarins umbelliferone and scopoletin have been isolated from the roots of Scopolia japonica. The hairy roots technique has also been used to produce the alkaloids scopolamine and hyoscyamine.

== Gallery ==
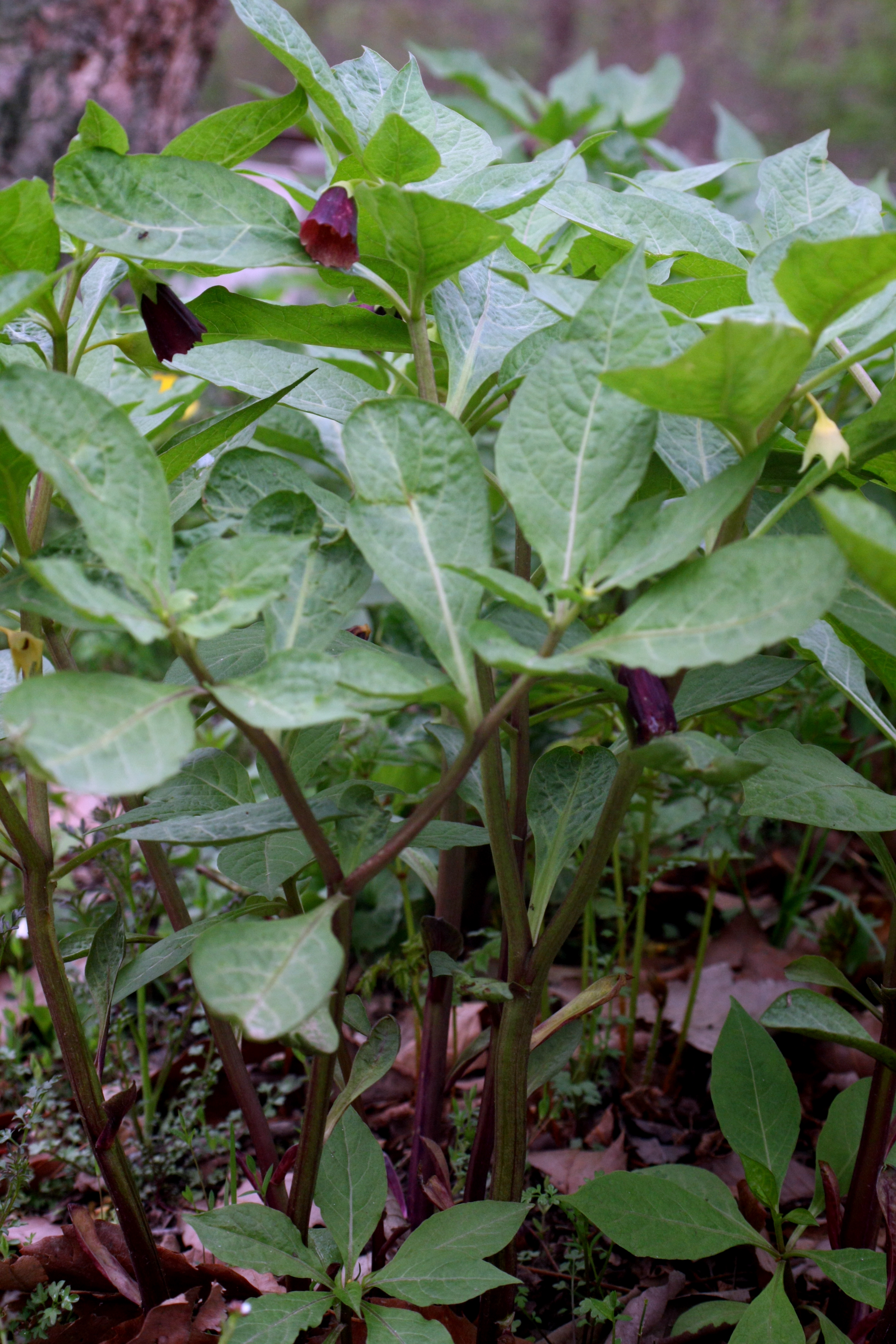
Plant in flower.

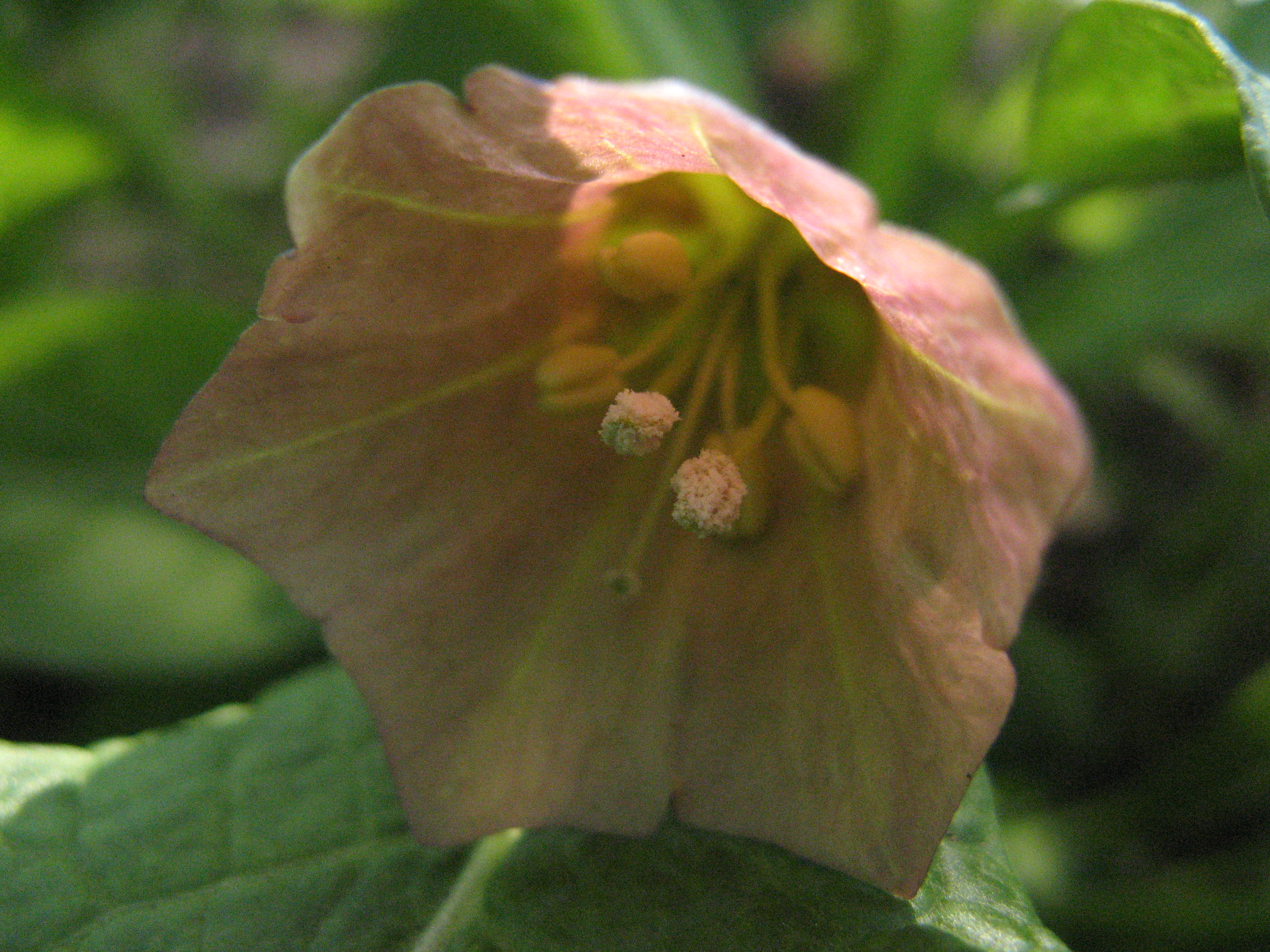
Single flower (interior).

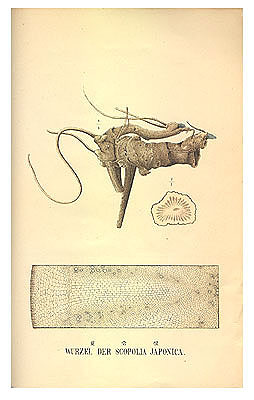
Scopoliae Rhizoma (root of Scopolia japonica)
