= Lists of molecules =

This is an index of lists of molecules (i.e. by year, number of atoms, etc.). Millions of molecules have existed in the universe since before the formation of Earth. Three of them, carbon dioxide, water and oxygen were necessary for the growth of life. Although humanity had always been surrounded by these substances, it has not always known what they were composed of.

== By century ==
The following is an index of list of molecules organized by time of discovery of their molecular formula or their specific molecule in case of isomers:

List of compounds

== By number of carbon atoms in the molecule ==
- List of compounds with carbon number 1
- List of compounds with carbon number 2
- List of compounds with carbon number 3
- List of compounds with carbon number 4
- List of compounds with carbon number 5
- List of compounds with carbon number 6
- List of compounds with carbon number 7
- List of compounds with carbon number 8
- List of compounds with carbon number 9
- List of compounds with carbon number 10
- List of compounds with carbon number 11
- List of compounds with carbon number 12
- List of compounds with carbon number 13
- List of compounds with carbon number 14
- List of compounds with carbon number 15
- List of compounds with carbon number 16
- List of compounds with carbon number 17
- List of compounds with carbon number 18
- List of compounds with carbon number 19
- List of compounds with carbon number 20
- List of compounds with carbon number 21
- List of compounds with carbon number 22
- List of compounds with carbon number 23
- List of compounds with carbon number 24
- List of compounds with carbon numbers 25-29
- List of compounds with carbon numbers 30-39
- List of compounds with carbon numbers 40-49
- List of compounds with carbon numbers 50+

== Other lists ==
- List of interstellar and circumstellar molecules
- List of gases
- List of molecules with unusual names

== See also ==
- Molecule
- Empirical formula
- Chemical formula
- Chemical structure
- Chemical compound
- Chemical bond
- Coordination complex
- List of chemical elements
- List of drugs by year of discovery
- Timeline of chemical element discoveries
- Diatomic molecule
- Atomic model
- History of molecular theory
