= Lists of compounds =

Set index article

Compounds are organized into the following lists:

- List of inorganic compounds, compounds without a C–H bond
- List of biomolecules

== Carbon number ==
- List of compounds with carbon number 1
- List of compounds with carbon number 2
- List of compounds with carbon number 3
- List of compounds with carbon number 4
- List of compounds with carbon number 5
- List of compounds with carbon number 6
- List of compounds with carbon number 7
- List of compounds with carbon number 8
- List of compounds with carbon number 9
- List of compounds with carbon number 10
- List of compounds with carbon number 11
- List of compounds with carbon number 12
- List of compounds with carbon number 13
- List of compounds with carbon number 14
- List of compounds with carbon number 15
- List of compounds with carbon number 16
- List of compounds with carbon number 17
- List of compounds with carbon number 18
- List of compounds with carbon number 19
- List of compounds with carbon number 20
- List of compounds with carbon number 21
- List of compounds with carbon number 22
- List of compounds with carbon number 23
- List of compounds with carbon number 24
- List of compounds with carbon numbers 25–29
- List of compounds with carbon numbers 30–39
- List of compounds with carbon numbers 40–49
- List of compounds with carbon numbers 50+

== Other ==
- List of alchemical substances
- List of chemical elements
- List of fragrance compounds
- List of minerals
- List of named alloys
- List of straight-chain alkanes

== See also ==
- Chemical substance – Form of matter
- Polyatomic ion – Ion containing two or more atoms
- Exotic molecule – a compound containing one or more exotic atoms
