= C6H12S =

The molecular formula C_{6}H_{12}S (molar mass: 116.22 g/mol, exact mass: 116.0660 u) may refer to:

- Cyclohexanethiol
- Thiepane
