= Alorac =

Weed control herbicide

Names
- IUPAC name (Z)-perchloro-4-oxopent-2-enoic acid
- Preferred IUPAC name (2Z)-2,3,5,5,5-pentachloro-4-oxopent-2-enoic acid
- Other names: (Z)-2,3,5,5,5-pentachloro-4-oxopent-2-enoic acid; (Z)-2,3,5,5,5-pentachloro-4-oxo-2-pentenoic acid

Identifiers
CAS Number	19360-02-2
3D model (JSmol)	Interactive image
ChemSpider	16740428
PubChem CID	20056888
UNII	U21AY79MMT
CompTox Dashboard (EPA)	DTXSID5058010
- InChI: InChI=1S/C5HCl5O3/c6-1(2(7)4(12)13)3(11)5(8,9)10/h(H,12,13)/b2-1- Key: RRLHZVASKJLNFJ-UPHRSURJSA-N
- SMILES: C(=C(C(=O)O)Cl)(C(=O)C(Cl)(Cl)Cl)Cl

Properties
Chemical formula	C_{5}HCl_{5}O_{3}
Molar mass	286.31 g·mol^{−1}

Related compounds
Related compounds	chloroacetic acid, chloropon, dalapon, flupropanate, TCA
- Except where otherwise noted, data are given for materials in their standard state (at 25 °C [77 °F], 100 kPa). Infobox references

Alorac is a halogenated aliphatic herbicide (plant growth regulator) which is thought to be obsolete, and released in the early 2000s, which works by inhibiting gibberellin biosynthesis.

Some 18 to 27 kg of CO_{2} are released for every kilogram of alorac technical produced.

There is little information available about alorac, though it is mentioned in many lists of herbicides.

Its US EPA chemical code is 22700.
