= List of compounds with carbon number 6 =

This is a partial list of molecules that contain 6 carbon atoms.

Chemical formula	Synonyms	CAS number
C_{6}ClF_{5}O_{2}S	pentafluorobenzenesulfonyl chloride	832-53-1
C_{6}CrO_{6}	chromium hexacarbonyl	13007-92-6
C_{6}Cr_{23}	chromium carbide	12105-81-6
C_{6}F_{14}NO	pentafluoronitrosobenzene	1423-13-8
C_{6}F_{10}	decafluorocyclohexene	355-75-9
C_{6}F_{10}O_{2}	octafluoroadipoyl fluoride	37881-62-2
C_{6}F_{10}O_{3}	pentafluoropropionic anhydride	356-42-3
C_{6}F_{13}I	perfluorohexyl iodide	355-43-1
C_{6}HBr_{5}O	pentabromophenol	608-71-9
C_{6}HCl_{3}O_{2}	trichlorobenzoquinone	634-85-5
C_{6}HCl_{5}S	pentachloro benzenethiol	133-49-3
C_{6}HF_{11}	undecafluorocyclohexane	308-24-7
C_{6}H_{2}Cl_{2}O_{4}	chloranilic acid	87-88-7
C_{6}H_{2}Cl_{5}N	pentachloroaniline	527-20-8
C_{6}H_{2}F_{4}O_{2}	tetrafluorohydroquinone	771-63-1
C_{6}H_{3}ClO_{2}	monochlorobenzoquinone	695-99-8
C_{6}H_{3}Br_{3}	tribromobenzene	
C_{6}H_{3}F_{7}O_{2}	vinyl perfluoro butyrate	356-28-5
C_{6}H_{3}O_{5}Re	methyl rhenium pentacarbonyl	14524-92-6
C_{6}H_{4}	benzyne	462-80-6
C_{6}H_{4}Br_{2}	dibromobenzene	
C_{6}H_{4}BrCl_{3}Si	bromophenyltrichlorosilane	27752-77-8
C_{6}H_{4}BrI	1-Bromo-4-iodobenzene	589-87-7
C_{6}H_{4}F_{6}O_{2}	hexafluoroisopropyl acrylate	2160-89-6
C_{6}H_{4}N	cyanocyclopentadienyl radical	129836-93-7
C_{6}H_{4}N_{2}O	benzofurazan	273-09-6
C_{6}H_{4}N_{4}O_{2}	lumazine	487-21-8
C_{6}H_{4}O_{6}	tetrahydroxy quinone	319-89-1
C_{6}H_{4}S_{2}	benzodithiete	81044-78-2
C_{6}H_{4}S_{4}	tetrathiafulvalene	31366-25-3
C_{6}H_{5}	phenyl radical	2396-01-2
C_{6}H_{5}AsCl_{2}	dichlorophenylarsine	696-28-6
C_{6}H_{5}BO_{2}	catecholborane	274-07-7
C_{6}H_{5}BrHg	phenylmercuric bromide	1192-89-8
C_{6}H_{5}BrSe	phenylselenenyl bromide	34837-55-3
C_{6}H_{5}ClO_{2}S	benzenesulfonyl chloride	98-09-9
C_{6}H_{5}ClSe	phenylselenenyl chloride	5707-04-0
C_{6}H_{5}Cl_{2}OP	phenylphosphoro dichloridite	3426-89-9
C_{6}H_{5}Cl_{3}Ge	phenyltrichlorogermane	1074-29-9
C_{6}H_{5}Cl_{3}Si	phenyl trichlorosilane	98-13-5
C_{6}H_{5}Cl_{3}Sn	phenyltrichlorostannane	1124-19-2
C_{6}H_{5}FO_{2}S	benzenesulfonyl fluoride	368-43-4
C_{6}H_{5}F_{3}Si	phenyl trifluorosilane	368-47-8
C_{6}H_{5}F_{5}O_{3}	methyl pentafluoropropionylacetate	104857-88-7
C_{6}H_{5}HgI	phenyl mercuric iodide	823-04-1
C_{6}H_{5}N	cyclopentadienecarbonitrile	27659-36-5
C_{6}H_{5}NOS	furfuryl isothiocyanate	4650-60-6
C_{6}H_{5}NO_{2}	isonicotinic acid	55-22-1
C_{6}H_{5}NO_{2}	niacin	59-67-6
C_{6}H_{5}N_{3}O_{5}	picramic acid	96-91-3
C_{6}H_{5}O	phenoxy radical	2122-46-5
C_{6}H_{5}S	phenylthio radical	4985-62-0
C_{6}H_{6}	benzene	71-43-2
C_{6}H_{6}	benzvalene	659-85-8
C_{6}H_{6}	fulvene	497-20-1
C_{6}H_{6}Cl_{2}Si	phenyldichlorosilane	1631-84-1
C_{6}H_{6}Cl_{6}	lindane	58-89-9
C_{6}H_{6}Cr	benzenechromium	61332-93-2
C_{6}H_{6}FNO_{2}S	metanilyl fluoride	368-50-3
C_{6}H_{6}N	anilino radical	2348-49-4
C_{6}H_{6}N_{2}O	acetylpyrazine	22047-25-2
C_{6}H_{6}N_{2}O	nicotinamide	98-92-0
C_{6}H_{6}N_{2}O_{2}	urocanic acid	104-98-3
C_{6}H_{6}O	furylethylene	1487-18-9
C_{6}H_{6}O	oxepin	291-70-3
C_{6}H_{6}O	phenol	108-95-2
C_{6}H_{6}OS	benzenesulfenic acid	27610-20-4
C_{6}H_{6}O_{2}	catechol	120-80-9
C_{6}H_{6}O_{2}	hydroquinone	123-31-9
C_{6}H_{6}O_{2}	resorcinol	108-46-3
C_{6}H_{6}O_{3}	isomaltol	3420-59-5
C_{6}H_{6}O_{3}	methyl furoate	1334-76-5
C_{6}H_{6}O_{3}S	benzenesulfonic acid	98-11-3
C_{6}H_{6}O_{5}	tricarballylic anhydride	500000-19-1
C_{6}H_{6}S	benzenethiol	108-98-5
C_{6}H_{6}Se	benzeneselenol	645-96-5
C_{6}H_{6}V	benzenevanadium	61332-91-0
C_{6}H_{7}	methylcyclopentadienyl radical	136202-28-3
C_{6}H_{7}AsO_{3}	benzenearsonie acid	98-05-5
C_{6}H_{7}N	aniline	62-53-3
C_{6}H_{7}NO	nicotinyl alcohol	100-55-0
C_{6}H_{7}NO	piconol	586-98-1
C_{6}H_{7}NO_{2}S	benzenesulfonamide	98-10-2
C_{6}H_{7}NO_{3}	methyl acetylcyanoacetate	3288-52-6
C_{6}H_{7}NO_{3}S	benzene sulfohydroxamic acid	599-71-3
C_{6}H_{7}NO_{3}S	metanilic acid	121-47-1
C_{6}H_{7}N_{3}O	isoniazid	54-85-3
C_{6}H_{7}N_{3}O	nicotinic acid hydrazide	553-53-7
C_{6}H_{7}P	phenylphosphine	638-21-1
C_{6}H_{7}Si	phenyl silyl radical	72975-30-5
C_{6}H_{8}	cyclopropylidene cyclopropane	27567-82-4
C_{6}H_{8}	ethynylcyclobutane	50786-62-4
C_{6}H_{8}AsNO_{3}	arsanilic acid	98-50-0
C_{6}H_{8}BrN	aniline hydrobromide	542-11-0
C_{6}H_{8}ClNS	chlormethiazole	533-45-9
C_{6}H_{8}Cl_{2}O_{2}	hexanedioyl dichloride	111-50-2
C_{6}H_{8}N_{2}	hexanedinitrile	111-69-3
C_{6}H_{8}N_{2}	picolamine	3731-52-0
C_{6}H_{8}N_{2}O	pyrazineethanol	6705-31-3
C_{6}H_{8}N_{2}O_{2}	tetramethylene furoxan	2209-36-1
C_{6}H_{8}O_{2}	acrolein dimer	100-73-2
C_{6}H_{8}O_{2}	dehydromevalonic lactone	2381-87-5
C_{6}H_{8}O_{2}	vinyl crotonate	14861-06-4
C_{6}H_{8}O_{4}	ethyl hydrogen fumarate	2459-05-4
C_{6}H_{9}B	trivinylborane	7217-01-8
C_{6}H_{9}ClO	cyclopentanecarbonyl chloride	4524-93-0
C_{6}H_{9}ClO_{2}	chloroethyl methacrylate	1888-94-4
C_{6}H_{9}F_{3}O_{2}	isobutyl trifluoroacetate	17355-83-8
C_{6}H_{9}N	cyclopentanecarbonitrile	4254-02-8
C_{6}H_{9}NO_{6}	nitrilotriacetic acid	139-13-9
C_{6}H_{9}NS	cyclopentyl isothiocyanate	33522-03-1
C_{6}H_{9}N_{3}O_{3}	metronidazole	443-48-1
C_{6}H_{9}N_{6}O_{3}P	norephedrine	14838-15-4
C_{6}H_{9}O_{6}Sc	scandium ethanoate	3804-23-7
C_{6}H_{9}P	trivinylphosphine	3746-01-8
C_{6}H_{10}	cyclohexene	110-83-8
C_{6}H_{10}	ethylidenecyclobutane	1528-21-8
C_{6}H_{10}	spirohexane	157-45-9
C_{6}H_{10}B_{2}N_{4}	pyrazabole	16998-91-7
C_{6}H_{10}CaO_{6}	calcium lactate	5743-47-5
C_{6}H_{10}Cl_{2}O_{2}	isobutyl dichloroacetate	37079-08-6
C_{6}H_{10}Cl_{2}Si	diallyldichlorosilane	3651-23-8
C_{6}H_{10}N_{2}	dicyclopropyldiazene	80201-75-8
C_{6}H_{10}N_{2}O_{2}	piracetam	7491-74-9
C_{6}H_{10}N_{2}O_{4}	diethyl azo diformate	1972-28-7
C_{6}H_{10}N_{4}	pentylenetetrazol	54-95-5
C_{6}H_{10}O	acetylcyclobutane	3019-25-8
C_{6}H_{10}O	cyclohexanone	108-94-1
C_{6}H_{10}O	cyclohexene oxide	286-20-4
C_{6}H_{10}O	hexenal	1335-39-3
C_{6}H_{10}O	meparfynol	77-75-8
C_{6}H_{10}OS	allyl thiopropionate	41820-22-8
C_{6}H_{10}OS_{2}	allicin	539-86-6
C_{6}H_{10}O_{2}	cyclobutanecarboxylic acid methyl ester	765-85-5
C_{6}H_{10}O_{2}	cyclobutyl ethanoate	500033-42-1
C_{6}H_{10}O_{2}	cyclopentane carboxylic acid	3400-45-1
C_{6}H_{10}O_{2}	ethyl cyclopropanecarboxylate	4606-07-9
C_{6}H_{10}O_{2}	isopropyl acrylate	689-12-3
C_{6}H_{10}O_{2}	methyl tiglate	6622-76-0
C_{6}H_{10}O_{2}S	methyl allylthioacetate	72867-23-3
C_{6}H_{10}O_{2}S_{2}	diethyl dithiol oxalate	615-85-0
C_{6}H_{10}O_{3}	butyl glyoxylate	6295-06-3
C_{6}H_{10}O_{3}	pantolactone	599-04-2
C_{6}H_{10}O_{4}	hexanedioic acid	124-04-9
C_{6}H_{10}O_{5}	diethyl pyrocarbonate	1609-47-8
C_{6}H_{10}O_{8}	galactaric acid	526-99-8
C_{6}H_{10}O_{8}	saccharic acid	87-73-0
C_{6}H_{10}S_{2}	diallyl disulfide	2179-57-9
C_{6}H_{10}S_{3}	diallyl trisulfide	2050-87-5
C_{6}H_{10}S_{4}	diallyl tetrasulfide	2444-49-7
C_{6}H_{11}	cyclohexyl radical	3170-58-9
C_{6}H_{11}BrHg	cyclohexyl mercuric bromide	10192-55-9
C_{6}H_{11}BrN_{2}O_{2}	bromisovalum	496-67-3
C_{6}H_{11}BrO_{2}	butyl bromoacetate	18991-98-5
C_{6}H_{11}ClO	hexanoyl chloride	142-61-0
C_{6}H_{11}ClO_{2}	chloroacetic acid butyl ester	590-02-3
C_{6}H_{11}ClO_{2}	sec butyl chloroacetate	17696-64-9
C_{6}H_{11}N	hexanenitrile	628-73-9
C_{6}H_{11}N	neopentyl cyanide	3302-16-7
C_{6}H_{11}NO	acetylpyrrolidine	4030-18-6
C_{6}H_{11}NO	caprolactam	105-60-2
C_{6}H_{11}NOS_{2}	sulforaphane	4478-93-7
C_{6}H_{11}NO_{2}	dipropionamide	6050-26-6
C_{6}H_{11}NO_{2}	pipecolic acid	4043-87-2
C_{6}H_{11}NO_{3}S	alliin	556-27-4
C_{6}H_{11}NS	neopentyl isothiocyanate	597-97-7
C_{6}H_{11}N_{2}O_{4}PS_{3}	methidathion	950-37-8
C_{6}H_{11}O_{2}Tl	thallium hexanoate	34244-90-1
C_{6}H_{11}O_{3}P	diallyl hydrogen phosphite	23679-20-1
C_{6}H_{11}O_{3}P	ethyl bicyclic phosphite	824-11-3
C_{6}H_{12}	cyclohexane	110-82-7
C_{6}H_{12}ClI	hexamethylene chloroiodide	34683-73-3
C_{6}H_{12}Cl_{2}S_{2}	sesquimustard	3563-36-8
C_{6}H_{12}NO_{3}P	diethyl cyanomethylphosphonate	2537-48-6
C_{6}H_{12}N_{2}	tetramethyldiazetine	54166-22-2
C_{6}H_{12}N_{2}	triethylenediamine	280-57-9
C_{6}H_{12}N_{2}O	nipecotamide	4138-26-5
C_{6}H_{12}N_{2}O	pipecolamide	19889-77-1
C_{6}H_{12}N_{2}O_{4}	ethyl glycylglycinate	627-74-7
C_{6}H_{12}N_{2}S	piperidine hydrothiocyanate	22205-64-7
C_{6}H_{12}N_{2}S_{3}	tetramethylthiuram monosulfide	97-74-5
C_{6}H_{12}N_{2}S_{4}	thiram	137-26-8
C_{6}H_{12}N_{2}S_{4}Zn	zinc dimethyldithiocarbamate	137-30-4
C_{6}H_{12}N_{4}	hexamethylenetetramine	100-97-0
C_{6}H_{12}O	cyclohexanol	108-93-0
C_{6}H_{12}O	cyclopentanemethanol	3637-61-4
C_{6}H_{12}O	hexanal	66-25-1
C_{6}H_{12}O	isopropyl allyl ether	6140-80-3
C_{6}H_{12}O	methyl isobutyl ketone	108-10-1
C_{6}H_{12}O	oxepane	592-90-5
C_{6}H_{12}O	vinylisobutyl ether	109-53-5
C_{6}H_{12}OS	butyl thiolacetate	928-47-2
C_{6}H_{12}O_{2}	cyclohexyl hydroperoxide	766-07-4
C_{6}H_{12}O_{2}	ethyl ethoxymethyl ketone	76086-05-0
C_{6}H_{12}O_{2}	hexanoic acid	142-62-1
C_{6}H_{12}O_{2}	isobutyl acetate	110-19-0
C_{6}H_{12}O_{2}	isoamyl formate	110-45-2
C_{6}H_{12}O_{2}	isopropyl propionate	637-78-5
C_{6}H_{12}O_{3}	butyl glycolate	7397-62-8
C_{6}H_{12}O_{3}	dimethoxymethyl allyl ether	154016-61-2
C_{6}H_{12}O_{3}	paraldehyde	123-63-7
C_{6}H_{12}O_{3}	propanoic acid ethoxymethyl ester	54078-53-4
C_{6}H_{12}O_{3}	propyl lactate	616-09-1
C_{6}H_{12}O_{4}	diethylene glycol monoacetate	2093-20-1
C_{6}H_{12}O_{4}	propionic acid dimer	32574-16-6
C_{6}H_{12}O_{5}	quercitol	488-73-3
C_{6}H_{12}O_{6}	fructose	7660-25-5
C_{6}H_{12}O_{6}	galactose	26566-61-0
C_{6}H_{12}O_{6}	glucose	50-99-7
C_{6}H_{12}O_{6}	hexahydroxycyclohexane	87-89-8
C_{6}H_{12}O_{6}	psicose	551-68-8
C_{6}H_{12}O_{7}	gluconic acid	526-95-4
C_{6}H_{12}S	cyclohexanethiol	1569-69-3
C_{6}H_{12}S	tetramethylthiirane	17066-32-9
C_{6}H_{12}S	thiepane	4753-80-4
C_{6}H_{12}Si	divinyldimethylsilane	10519-87-6
C_{6}H_{13}N	acetone propylimine	22023-64-9
C_{6}H_{13}N	cyclohexanamine	108-91-8
C_{6}H_{13}N	isobutyraldehyde ethylimine	1743-56-2
C_{6}H_{13}N	isobutyraldehyde ethylimine	28916-23-6
C_{6}H_{13}NO	hexanamide	628-02-4
C_{6}H_{13}NO_{2}	hexanohydroxamic acid	4312-93-0
C_{6}H_{13}NO_{2}	isoleucine	73-32-5
C_{6}H_{13}NO_{2}	leucine	61-90-5
C_{6}H_{13}NO_{2}	methylvaline	2480-23-1
C_{6}H_{13}NO_{2}	6-aminohexanoic acid	60-32-2
C_{6}H_{13}NS_{2}	methyl dithiocarbimidoic acid diethyl ester	75534-76-8
C_{6}H_{13}O_{3}P	diethyl vinylphosphonate	682-30-4
C_{6}H_{14}	hexane	110-54-3
C_{6}H_{14}FO_{2}P	butyl ethylphosphonofluoridate	18358-34-4
C_{6}H_{14}FO_{2}P	isobutyl ethylphosphonofluoridate	2261-83-8
C_{6}H_{14}FO_{2}P	pentyl methylphosphonofluoridate	13454-59-6
C_{6}H_{14}FO_{3}P	diisopropyl fluorophosphate	55-91-4
C_{6}H_{14}Hg	diisopropyl mercury	1071-39-2
C_{6}H_{14}NO_{4}P	dimethyl morpholinophosphoramidate	597-25-1
C_{6}H_{14}N_{2}	dipropyldiazene	821-67-0
C_{6}H_{14}N_{2}O_{2}	lysine	56-87-1
C_{6}H_{14}N_{2}O_{2}	nitro hexyl amine	500015-53-2
C_{6}H_{14}N_{4}O_{2}	adipic dihydrazide	1071-93-8
C_{6}H_{14}O	diisopropyl ether	108-20-3
C_{6}H_{14}OS	diisopropyl sulfoxide	2211-89-4
C_{6}H_{14}OS	dipropyl sulfoxide	4253-91-2
C_{6}H_{14}OSi	allyloxytrimethylsilane	18146-00-4
C_{6}H_{14}O_{2}	isobutyl cellosolve	4439-24-1
C_{6}H_{14}O_{2}S	ethyl isobutyl sulfone	34008-93-0
C_{6}H_{14}O_{2}S	methyl pentyl sulfone	6178-53-6
C_{6}H_{14}O_{3}	dipropylene glycol	106-62-7
C_{6}H_{14}O_{3}	dipropylene glycol	25265-71-8
C_{6}H_{14}O_{4}	triethylene glycol	112-27-6
C_{6}H_{14}O_{4}S	sulfuric acid dipropyl ester	598-05-0
C_{6}H_{14}O_{5}	L-fucitol; 6-deoxy-L-galactitol	13074-06-1
C_{6}H_{14}O_{6}	galactitol	608-66-2
C_{6}H_{14}O_{6}	allitol	488-44-8
C_{6}H_{14}O_{6}	sorbitol	50-70-4
C_{6}H_{14}O_{6}	D-mannitol	69-65-8
C_{6}H_{14}O_{6}	L-mannitol	643-01-6
C_{6}H_{14}O_{6}	D-iditol	25878-23-3
C_{6}H_{14}O_{6}	L-iditol	488-45-9
C_{6}H_{14}O_{6}	altritol	5552-13-6
C_{6}H_{14}S	diisopropyl sulfide	625-80-9
C_{6}H_{14}S_{2}	nprssnpr radical	34525-28-5
C_{6}H_{14}S_{3}	dipropyl trisulfide	6028-61-1
C_{6}H_{14}S_{4}	dipropyl tetrasulfide	52687-98-6
C_{6}H_{15}Al	triethylaluminium	97-93-8
C_{6}H_{15}AlO_{3}	aluminium triethoxide	555-75-9
C_{6}H_{15}As	triethylarsine	617-75-4
C_{6}H_{15}Bi	triethylbismuth	617-77-6
C_{6}H_{15}Bi	triethylbismuth	617-77-6
C_{6}H_{15}BO_{3}	triethyl borate	150-46-9
C_{6}H_{15}ClPb	triethyl lead chloride	1067-14-7
C_{6}H_{15}Ga	triethylgallium	1115-99-7
C_{6}H_{15}In	triethylindium	923-34-2
C_{6}H_{15}N	triethylamine	121-44-8
C_{6}H_{15}N	diisopropylamine	108-18-9
C_{6}H_{15}NO_{2}	diisopropanolamine	110-97-4
C_{6}H_{15}NO_{2}	dimethylaminoacetaldehyde dimethyl acetal	38711-20-5
C_{6}H_{15}NO_{2}	ethyldiethanolamine	139-87-7
C_{6}H_{15}NO_{3}	triethanolamine	102-71-6
C_{6}H_{15}O_{2}PS_{3}	thiometon	640-15-3
C_{6}H_{15}O_{3}P	diethyl ethylphosphonate	78-38-6
C_{6}H_{15}O_{3}PS	diethyl methylthiomethylphosphonate	28460-01-7
C_{6}H_{15}O_{4}P	triethyl phosphate	78-40-0
C_{6}H_{16}NO_{3}P	diethyl dimethylphosphoramidate	2404-03-7
C_{6}H_{16}N_{2}	propyltrimethylhydrazine	60678-65-1
C_{6}H_{16}N_{2}O_{2}	diisopropyl ammonium nitrite	3129-93-9
C_{6}H_{16}N_{2}S	thiodipropylamine	13643-20-4
C_{6}H_{16}N_{4}O_{6}	triacetamide nitrate	54800-07-6
C_{6}H_{16}O_{5}P_{2}	diethyl dimethylpyrophosphonate	32288-17-8
C_{6}H_{16}Si	isopropyltrimethylsilane	3429-52-5
C_{6}H_{17}BeF_{4}N_{3}O_{6}	triglycine fluoroberyllate	2396-72-7
C_{6}H_{17}N_{2}O_{2}P	ethyl tetramethylphosphorodiamidate	2404-65-1
C_{6}H_{17}N_{3}O_{10}S	triglycine sulfate	513-29-1
C_{6}H_{18}BN	triethylamineborane	1722-26-5
C_{6}H_{18}N_{3}P_{3}	hexamethylcyclotriphosphazene	6607-30-3
C_{6}H_{18}N_{4}	triethylenetetramine	112-24-3
C_{6}H_{18}O_{3}Si_{3}	hexamethylcyclotrisiloxane	54-15-9
C_{6}H_{18}O_{3}Si_{3}	hexamethylcyclotrisiloxane	541-05-9
C_{6}H_{18}SSn_{2}	hexamethyldistannathiane	1070-91-3
C_{6}H_{18}SeSn_{2}	hexamethyldistannaselenane	7262-34-2
C_{6}H_{18}Sn_{2}	hexamethylditin	661-69-8
C_{6}H_{18}W	hexamethyl tungsten	36133-73-0
C_{6}H_{21}N_{3}Si_{3}	hexamethylcyclotrisilazane	1009-93-4
C_{6}MoO_{6}	molybdenum hexacarbonyl	13939-06-5
C_{6}N_{2}	hexadiynedinitrile	16419-78-6
C_{6}N_{4}	tetracyanoethylene	670-54-2
C_{6}O_{6}V	vanadium hexacarbonyl	14024-00-1
C_{6}O_{6}W	tungsten hexacarbonyl	14040-11-0

== See also ==
- Carbon number
- List of compounds with carbon number 5
- List of compounds with carbon number 7
