= List of compounds with carbon number 20 =

This is a partial list of molecules that contain 20 carbon atoms.

Chemical formula	Synonyms	CAS number
C_{20}F_{42}	perfluoroicosane	37589–57–4
C_{20}H_{6}I_{4}Na_{2}O_{5}	erythrosine	16423–68–0
C_{20}H_{12}	perylene	198–55–0
C_{20}H_{12}	benz(e)acephenanthrylene	205-99-2
C_{20}H_{12}O_{5}	fluorescein	2321–07–5
C_{20}H_{13}N_{3}O_{7}	anthracene picric acid	5937–78–0
C_{20}H_{14}NO_{4}	sanguinarine	2447–54–3
C_{20}H_{14}O_{4}	diphenyl isophthalate	744-45-6
C_{20}H_{14}O_{4}	diphenyl terephthalate	1539-04-4
C_{20}H_{14}O_{4}	phenolphthalein	77–09–8
C_{20}H_{14}O_{4}	resorcinol dibenzoate	94-01-9
C_{20}H_{15}NS	trityl isothiocyanate	1726–94–9
C_{20}H_{16}	triphenylethylene	50–72–0
C_{20}H_{16}Fe_{2}I_{3}	biferrocenium triiodide	39470–17–2
C_{20}H_{16}N_{2}O	benzyl phenylhydrazone	6630–86–0
C_{20}H_{16}O_{2}	triphenylacetic acid	595–91–5
C_{20}H_{16}O_{4}S_{2}	c.i. vat orange 5	3263–31–8
C_{20}H_{17}ClO	methoxytriphenylchloromethane	14470–28–1
C_{20}H_{17}ClN_{2}O_{3}	ketazolam	27223–35–4
C_{20}H_{18}NO_{4}	berberine	2086–83–1
C_{20}H_{18}N_{2}O	benzoin phenylhydrazone	574–07–2
C_{20}H_{18}O_{2}Sn	triphenyl tin acetate	900–95–8
C_{20}H_{18}O_{5}	Wighteone and other molecules	51225–30–0
C_{20}H_{18}Sn	triphenyl vinyl tin	2117–48–8
C_{20}H_{19}N	triphenylethylamine	352535–04–7
C_{20}H_{19}N	dibenzyl aniline	91–73–6
C_{20}H_{19}NO_{3}	acronycine	7008–42–6
C_{20}H_{19}NO_{5}	protopine	130–86–9
C_{20}H_{20}	dodecahedrane	4493–23–6
C_{20}H_{20}OSi	ethoxytriphenyl silane	1516–80–9
C_{20}H_{20}O_{7}	tangeritin and other molecules	481–53–8
C_{20}H_{20}Sn	ethyltriphenylstannane	5424–25–9
C_{20}H_{21}ClN_{2}O_{4}	fipexide	34161–24–5
C_{20}H_{21}FN_{2}O	citalopram	59729–33–8
C_{20}H_{21}F_{3}N_{2}OS	fluacizine	30223–48–4
C_{20}H_{21}N	cyclobenzaprine	303–53–7
C_{20}H_{21}NO_{3}	dimefline	1165–48–6
C_{20}H_{21}NO_{3}	mepixanthone	17854–59–0
C_{20}H_{21}NO_{4}	papaverin	58–74–2
C_{20}H_{22}ClN	pyrrobutamine	91–82–7
C_{20}H_{22}ClN_{3}O	amodiaquine	86–42–0
C_{20}H_{22}N_{2}	azatadine	3964–81–6
C_{20}H_{22}N_{2}O_{2}	gelsemine	509–15–9
C_{20}H_{22}N_{2}S	mequitazine	29216–28–2
C_{20}H_{22}N_{8}O_{5}	methotrexate	59–05–2
C_{20}H_{22}O_{3}	avobenzone	70356–09–1
C_{20}H_{22}O_{5}	dipropylene glycol dibenzoate	20109–39–1
C_{20}H_{23}BrN_{2}O_{4}	brompheniramine maleate	980–71–2
C_{20}H_{23}ClN_{2}O_{4}	chlormene	2438–32–6
C_{20}H_{23}N	amitriptyline	50–48–6
C_{20}H_{23}N	maprotiline	10262–69–8
C_{20}H_{23}NO_{2}	amethone base	76–65–3
C_{20}H_{23}NO_{3}	methantheline	5818–17–7
C_{20}H_{23}NO_{4}	thebacon	466–90–0
C_{20}H_{23}NS	methixene	4969–02–2
C_{20}H_{24}ClN	amitriptyline hydrochloride	549–18–8
C_{20}H_{24}ClNO	cloperastine	3703–76–2
C_{20}H_{24}ClNO_{2}	metofoline	2154–02–1
C_{20}H_{24}ClN_{3}S	prochlorperazine	58–38–8
C_{20}H_{24}N_{2}OS	propiomazine	362–29–8
C_{20}H_{24}N_{2}OS	propionylpromazine	3568–24–9
C_{20}H_{24}N_{2}O_{2}	chinine	130–95–0
C_{20}H_{24}N_{2}O_{2}	quinine	56–54–2
C_{20}H_{24}N_{2}O_{2}	viquidil	84–55–9
C_{20}H_{24}O_{2}	ethinylestradiol	57–63–6
C_{20}H_{25}NO	normethadone	467–85–6
C_{20}H_{25}NO_{2}	adiphenine	64–95–9
C_{20}H_{25}NO_{3}	benactyzine	302–40–9
C_{20}H_{25}NO_{4}	acetyldihydrocodeine	3861–72–1
C_{20}H_{25}NO_{4}	laudanine	85–64–3
C_{20}H_{25}N_{3}O	lysergic acid diethylamide	50–37–3
C_{20}H_{26}N_{2}	dimetacrine	4757–55–5
C_{20}H_{26}N_{2}	trimipramine	739–71–9
C_{20}H_{26}N_{2}O	ibogaine	83–74–9
C_{20}H_{26}N_{2}O_{2}	ajmaline	4360–12–7
C_{20}H_{26}N_{2}O_{2}	hydroquinidine	1435–55–8
C_{20}H_{26}N_{2}O_{2}	hydroquinine	522–66–7
C_{20}H_{26}O	norethisterone	68–22–4
C_{20}H_{27}N	alverine	150–59–4
C_{20}H_{27}N	dehydro abietyl nitrile	31148–95–5
C_{20}H_{27}N	terodiline	15793–40–5
C_{20}H_{27}NO_{5}	chromonar	804–10–4
C_{20}H_{27}N_{3}O_{3}	oroboidine	6874–80–2
C_{20}H_{27}O_{4}P	octyl diphenyl phosphate	115–88–8
C_{20}H_{27}BrN_{2}0	ambutonium bromide	115–51–5
C_{20}H_{28}N_{2}O_{3}	oxyphencyclimine	125–53–1
C_{20}H_{28}O	dehydroabietal	13601–88–2
C_{20}H_{28}O	vitamin a aldehyde	116–31–4
C_{20}H_{28}O_{2}	methandienone	72–63–9
C_{20}H_{28}O_{4}	hulupone	468–62–2
C_{20}H_{28}Sn	dibutyldiphenyl tin	6452–61–5
C_{20}H_{29}N_{3}O_{2}	dibucaine	85–79–0
C_{20}H_{30}	hexacyclopropylethane	26902–55–6
C_{20}H_{30}N_{2}O_{2}	furazabol	1239–29–8
C_{20}H_{30}N_{2}O_{3}	morpheridine	469–81–8
C_{20}H_{30}O	dehydroabietinol	3772–55–2
C_{20}H_{30}O	ferruginol	514–62–5
C_{20}H_{30}O	retinol	68–26–8
C_{20}H_{30}O	totarol	511–15–9
C_{20}H_{30}O_{2}	neoabietic acid	471–77–2
C_{20}H_{30}O_{2}	norethandrolone	52–78–8
C_{20}H_{30}O_{3}	oxymesterone	145–12–0
C_{20}H_{30}O_{4}	ethyl decyl terephthalate	54699–33–1
C_{20}H_{30}O_{4}	nonyl benzyl succinate	119450–17–8
C_{20}H_{30}O_{4}	dihexyl phthalate	84–75–3
C_{20}H_{30}Re	decamethylrhenocene	98814–97–2
C_{20}H_{31}NO	trihexyphenidyl	144–11–6
C_{20}H_{31}NO_{7}	echimidine	520–68–3
C_{20}H_{31}NO_{7}	heliosupine	32728–78–2
C_{20}H_{32}	beyerene	3564–54–3
C_{20}H_{32}	cembrene a	31570–39–5
C_{20}H_{32}	cembrene	1898–13–1
C_{20}H_{32}	isokaurene	5947–50–2
C_{20}H_{32}	isophyllocladene	511–85–3
C_{20}H_{32}	isopimaradiene	1686–66–4
C_{20}H_{32}	kaurene	34424–57–2
C_{20}H_{32}	rimuene	1686–67–5
C_{20}H_{32}	sandaracopimaradiene	1686–56–2
C_{20}H_{32}	sclarene	511–02–4
C_{20}H_{32}	trachylobane	5282–35–9
C_{20}H_{32}N_{2}O_{3}S	carbosulfan	55285–14–8
C_{20}H_{32}N_{10}O	decaglycine	76960–32–2
C_{20}H_{32}O	tetradecanophenone	4497–05–6
C_{20}H_{32}O_{2}	arachidonic acid	506–32–1
C_{20}H_{32}O_{2}	methandriol	521–10–8
C_{20}H_{33}NO	fenpropimorph	67306–03–0
C_{20}H_{34}O	manool	596–85–0
C_{20}H_{34}O	manoyl oxide	596–84–9
C_{20}H_{34}O	thunbergol	25269–17–4
C_{20}H_{34}O_{2}	larixol	1438–66–0
C_{20}H_{34}O_{5}	prostaglandin E1	745–65–3
C_{20}H_{35}NOS	suloctidil	54063–56–8
C_{20}H_{35}NO_{2}	dihexyverine	561–77–3
C_{20}H_{35}N_{3}	ormosanine	33792–80–2
C_{20}H_{36}N_{2}	tetraisobutylsuccinonitrile	85688–86–4
C_{20}H_{36}O_{2}	ethyl linolate	544–35–4
C_{20}H_{36}O_{2}	sclareol	515–03–7
C_{20}H_{37}F_{3}O_{2}	octadecyl trifluoroacetate	79392–43–1
C_{20}H_{37}NO_{3}	rociverine	53716–44–2
C_{20}H_{38}HgO_{4}	mercuric decanoate	27394–49–6
C_{20}H_{38}O	cycloicosanone	6907–39–7
C_{20}H_{38}O_{4}	dioctyl succinate	2915–57–3
C_{20}H_{38}O_{4}	icosanedioic acid	2424–92–2
C_{20}H_{39}N	icosanenitrile	4616–73–3
C_{20}H_{40}	eicosene	3452–07–1
C_{20}H_{40}	cycloicosane	296–56–0
C_{20}H_{40}N_{4}S_{8}Te	ethyl tellurac	20941–65–5
C_{20}H_{40}O	isophytol	505–32–8
C_{20}H_{40}O_{2}	icosanoic acid	506–30–9
C_{20}H_{40}O_{2}	methyl nonadecanoate	1731–94–8
C_{20}H_{40}O_{2}	nonadecyl methanoate	66455–49–0
C_{20}H_{41}NO	hexadecyl pyrrolidine oxide	74493–16–6
C_{20}H_{42}	icosane	112–95–8
C_{20}H_{42}O_{2}S	didecyl sulfone	500026–38–0
C_{20}H_{42}S	decyl sulfide	693–83–4
C_{20}H_{42}S_{2}	decyl disulfide	10496–18–1
C_{20}H_{43}N	dimethyloctadecylamine	124–28–7
C_{20}H_{44}ClN	tetrapentylammonium chloride	4965–17–7
C_{20}H_{44}Ge	tetrapentyl germane	3634–47–7
C_{20}H_{44}IN	tetrapentylammonium iodide	2498–20–6
C_{20}H_{44}Sn	tetraamylstannane	3765–65–9
C_{20}H_{50}Si_{5}	decaethylcyclopentasilane	75217–22–0

== See also ==
- Carbon number
- List of compounds with carbon number 19
- List of compounds with carbon number 21
