= Carbon number =

Number of carbon atoms in a chemical compound

In organic chemistry, the carbon number of a compound is the number of carbon atoms in each molecule. The properties of hydrocarbons can be correlated with the carbon number, although the carbon number alone does not give an indication of the saturation of the organic compound. When describing a particular molecule, the "carbon number" is also the ordinal position of a particular carbon atom in a chain.

== Compounds by carbon number ==
- 1
- 2
- 3
- 4
- 5
- 6
- 7
- 8
- 9
- 10
- 11
- 12
- 13
- 14
- 15
- 16
- 17
- 18
- 19
- 20
- 21
- 22
- 23
- 24
- 25–29
- 30–39
- 40–49
- 50+

== See also ==
- IUPAC nomenclature of organic chemistry
