= List of compounds with carbon number 5 =

This is a partial list of molecules that contain 5 carbon atoms.

Chemical formula	Synonyms	CAS number
C_{5}BrMnO_{5}	manganese pentacarbonyl bromide	14516-54-2
C_{5}BrO_{5}Re	rhenium pentacarbonyl bromide	14220-21-4
C_{5}Cl_{2}F_{6}O_{2}	hexafluoroglutaryl chloride	678-77-3
C_{5}F_{6}O_{3}	hexafluoroglutaric acid anhydride	376-68-1
C_{5}F_{8}O_{2}	hexafluoroglutaryl fluoride	678-78-4
C_{5}F_{10}	decafluorocyclopentane	376-77-2
C_{5}F_{11}N	undecafluoropiperidine	836-77-1
C_{5}F_{13}N	perfluoromethyldiethylamine	758-48-5
C_{5}FeO_{4}S	tetracarbonyl carbonothioyl iron	66517-47-3
C_{5}FeO_{5}	iron pentacarbonyl	13463-40-6
C_{5}HCl_{5}O_{3}	alorac	19360-02-2
C_{5}HMnO_{5}	hydromanganese pentacarbonyl	16972-33-1
C_{5}HN_{3}	ethylenetricarbonitrile	997-76-2
C_{5}H_{2}F_{6}O_{4}	hexafluoroglutaric acid	376-73-8
C_{5}H_{3}CoF_{2}O_{4}Si	methyldifluorosilylcobalt tetracarbonyl	26024-31-7
C_{5}H_{3}N_{3}	cyanopyrazine	19847-12-2
C_{5}H_{4}	cyclopentadienylide radical	4729-01-5
C_{5}H_{4}Cl_{2}O_{2}	itaconyl chloride	1931-60-8
C_{5}H_{4}Cl_{6}O_{3}	clorethate	5634-37-7
C_{5}H_{4}F_{6}N_{2}O_{2}	perfluoroglutaramide	507-68-6
C_{5}H_{4}N_{2}O	pyrazinecarboxaldehyde	5780-66-5
C_{5}H_{4}N_{2}O_{2}	pyrazinoic acid	98-97-5
C_{5}H_{4}N_{2}O_{4}	orotic acid	65-86-1
C_{5}H_{4}N_{4}	pyridotetrazole	274-87-3
C_{5}H_{4}N_{4}O	allopurinol	315-30-0
C_{5}H_{4}N_{4}O	hypoxanthine	68-94-0
C_{5}H_{4}N_{4}O_{2}	xanthine	69-89-6
C_{5}H_{4}N_{4}O_{3}	uric acid	69-93-2
C_{5}H_{4}N_{4}S	tisopurine	5334-23-6
C_{5}H_{4}OS	2-thiophenecarboxaldehyde	98-03-3
C_{5}H_{4}OS	3-thiophenecarboxaldehyde	498-62-4
C_{5}H_{4}O_{3}	furancarboxylic acid	26447-28-9
C_{5}H_{5}	cyclopentadiene	542-92-7
C_{5}H_{5}	cyclopentadienyl radical	2143-53-5
C_{5}H_{5}As	arsabenzene	289-31-6
C_{5}H_{5}Bi	bismin	289-52-1
C_{5}H_{5}Co	cyclopentadienylcobalt	61332-89-6
C_{5}H_{5}F_{3}O_{2}	allyl trifluoroacetate	383-67-5
C_{5}H_{5}N	pyridine	110-86-1
C_{5}H_{5}NOS	crotonyl isothiocyanate	60034-28-8
C_{5}H_{5}NO_{2}	furamide	609-38-1
C_{5}H_{5}NO_{2}	mecrylate	137-05-3
C_{5}H_{5}N_{3}O	pyrazinamide or pyrazine carboxamide	98-96-4
C_{5}H_{5}N_{5}	adenine	73-24-5
C_{5}H_{5}Ni	cyclopentadienylnickel	61332-95-4
C_{5}H_{5}P	Phosphorine or phosphabenzene	289-68-9
C_{5}H_{5}Sb	antimonin	289-75-8
C_{5}H_{6}	cyclopropylacetylene	6746-94-7
C_{5}H_{6}BrN	pyridinium bromide	18820-82-1
C_{5}H_{6}Cl_{2}O_{2}	allyl dichloroacetate	30895-77-3
C_{5}H_{6}Cl_{2}O_{2}	pentanedioyl dichloride	2873-74-7
C_{5}H_{6}F_{6}NP	pyridium hexafluorophosphate	16941-15-4
C_{5}H_{6}IN	pyridium iodide	18820-83-2
C_{5}H_{6}N_{2}	glutaronitrile	544-13-8
C_{5}H_{6}N_{2}O_{2}	thymine	65-71-4
C_{5}H_{6}O	2-methylfuran	534-22-5
C_{5}H_{6}O	3-methylfuran	930-27-8
C_{5}H_{6}O	vinyl allenyl ether	4409-99-8
C_{5}H_{6}O_{2}	ethyl propiolate	623-47-2
C_{5}H_{6}O_{4}	citraconic acid	7407-59-2
C_{5}H_{6}S	2-methylthiophene	554-14-3
C_{5}H_{6}S	3-methylthiophene	616-44-4
C_{5}H_{6}S_{2}	3-(methylthio)thiophene	20731-74-2
C_{5}H_{6}Si	silabenzene	289-77-0
C_{5}H_{7}	cyclopentenyl radical	10577-65-8
C_{5}H_{7}ClO	cyclobutanecarboxylic acid chloride	5006-22-4
C_{5}H_{7}ClO_{2}	chloroacetic acid allyl ester	2916-14-5
C_{5}H_{7}ClO_{3}	ethyl malonyl chloride	36239-09-5
C_{5}H_{7}ClO_{4}	dimethyl chloromalonate	28868-76-0
C_{5}H_{7}Cl_{3}O_{2}	trichloroaetic acid isopropyl ester	3974-99-0
C_{5}H_{7}F_{3}O_{2}	isopropyl trifluoroacetate	400-38-4
C_{5}H_{7}N	cyclobutanecarbonitrile	4426-11-3
C_{5}H_{7}N	methallyl cyanide	4786-19-0
C_{5}H_{7}NO_{2}	glutarimide	1121-89-7
C_{5}H_{7}NO_{3}	pidolic acid	98-79-3
C_{5}H_{7}N_{3}O_{2}	dimetridazole	551-92-8
C_{5}H_{8}	cyclopentene	142-29-0
C_{5}H_{8}	ethenylcyclopropane	693-86-7
C_{5}H_{8}	ethylidenecyclopropane	18631-83-9
C_{5}H_{8}	spiropentane	157-40-4
C_{5}H_{8}N_{4}O_{3}S_{2}	methazolamide	554-57-4
C_{5}H_{8}O	cyclobutanecarboxaldehyde	2987-17-9
C_{5}H_{8}O	cyclopentanone	120-92-3
C_{5}H_{8}O	propargylethyl ether	628-33-1
C_{5}H_{8}O_{2}	acetylacetone	123-54-6
C_{5}H_{8}O_{2}	cyclobutane carboxylic acid	3721-95-7
C_{5}H_{8}O_{2}	cyclopropaneacetic acid	5239-82-7
C_{5}H_{8}O_{2}	glutaraldehyde	111-30-8
C_{5}H_{8}O_{2}	angelic acid	565-63-9
C_{5}H_{8}O_{2}	tiglic acid	80-59-1
C_{5}H_{8}O_{4}	ethylmalonic acid	601-75-2
C_{5}H_{8}O_{4}	methylene diacetate	628-51-3
C_{5}H_{8}O_{4}	glutaric acid	110-94-1
C_{5}H_{8}S	propargyl ethyl sulfide	7310-92-1
C_{5}H_{9}	cyclopentyl radical	3889-74-5
C_{5}H_{9}Br	bromotrimethylethylene	3017-70-7
C_{5}H_{9}Cl	chlorocyclopentane	930-28-9
C_{5}H_{9}ClO	ethylmethylacetylchloride	57526-28-0
C_{5}H_{9}ClO	pentanoyl chloride	638-29-9
C_{5}H_{9}ClO	tetrahydrofurfuryl chloride	3003-84-7
C_{5}H_{9}ClO_{2}	chloroacetic acid isopropyl ester	105-48-6
C_{5}H_{9}ClO_{2}	chloroacetic acid propyl ester	5396-24-7
C_{5}H_{9}ClO_{2}	isobutyl chloroformate	543-27-1
C_{5}H_{9}F	fluorocyclopentane	1481-36-3
C_{5}H_{9}FO_{2}	butyl fluoromethanoate	500023-96-1
C_{5}H_{9}N	isobutylisocyanide	590-94-3
C_{5}H_{9}N	pentanenitrile	110-59-8
C_{5}H_{9}NO	piperidinone	27154-43-4
C_{5}H_{9}NO_{2}	proline	147-85-3
C_{5}H_{9}NO_{2}S	isothiocyanatoacetaldehyde dimethyl acetal	75052-04-9
C_{5}H_{9}NO_{2}S	propanesulfonylacetonitrile	175137-61-8
C_{5}H_{9}NO_{3}	hydroxyproline	51-35-4
C_{5}H_{9}NO_{3}S	acetylcysteine	616-91-1
C_{5}H_{9}NS	isobutyl isothiocyanate	591-82-2
C_{5}H_{9}N_{3}	azidocyclopentane	33670-50-7
C_{5}H_{9}N_{3}	betazole	105-20-4
C_{5}H_{9}N_{3}	histamine	51-45-6
C_{5}H_{9}O_{2}Tl	thallium pentanoate	34244-89-8
C_{5}H_{10}	cyclopentane	287-92-3
C_{5}H_{10}	ethylcyclopropane	1191-96-4
C_{5}H_{10}	1,1-dimethylcyclopropane	1630-94-0
C_{5}H_{10}	cis-1,2-dimethylcyclopropane	930-18-7
C_{5}H_{10}	trans-1,2-dimethylcyclopropane	2402-06-4
C_{5}H_{10}	methylcyclobutane	598-61-8
C_{5}H_{10}BrF_{2}O_{3}P	bromodifluoromethyl diethylphosphonate	65094-22-6
C_{5}H_{10}ClNO_{4}	glutamic acid hydrochloride	138-15-8
C_{5}H_{10}Cl_{2}O_{2}	pentaerythritol dichlorohydrin	2209-86-1
C_{5}H_{10}NO_{3}P	diethyl phosphorocyanidate	2942-58-7
C_{5}H_{10}N_{2}	diethylcyanamide	617-83-4
C_{5}H_{10}N_{2}O_{2}S	methomyl	16752-77-5
C_{5}H_{10}N_{2}O_{3}	alanylglycine	687-69-4
C_{5}H_{10}N_{6}O_{4}	dinitropentamethylenetetramine	949-56-4
C_{5}H_{10}O	butenol methyl	60766-00-9
C_{5}H_{10}O	cyclobutanemethanol	4415-82-1
C_{5}H_{10}O	cyclopentanol	96-41-3
C_{5}H_{10}O	cyclopropaneethanol	2566-44-1
C_{5}H_{10}O	cyclopropyl methyl carbinol	765-42-4
C_{5}H_{10}O	pentanal	110-62-3
C_{5}H_{10}O	propoxyethylene	764-47-6
C_{5}H_{10}OS	ethyl thiopropionate	2432-42-0
C_{5}H_{10}O_{2}	methoxymethyl allyl ether	62322-45-6
C_{5}H_{10}O_{2}	valeric acid	109-52-4
C_{5}H_{10}O_{2}	pivalic acid	75-98-9
C_{5}H_{10}O_{2}	sec butylformate	589-40-2
C_{5}H_{10}O_{3}	hydroxy pivalic acid	4835-90-9
C_{5}H_{10}O_{3}	isopropoxyacetic acid	33445-07-7
C_{5}H_{10}O_{3}S	ethylsulfonylpropanone	86453-13-6
C_{5}H_{10}O_{4}	deoxyribose	533-67-5
C_{5}H_{10}O_{4}	monoacetine	26446-35-5
C_{5}H_{10}O_{5} (aldopentoses)	arabinose	147-81-9
C_{5}H_{10}O_{5} (aldopentoses)	D-arabinose	10323-20-3
C_{5}H_{10}O_{5} (aldopentoses)	L-arabinose	87-72-9
C_{5}H_{10}O_{5} (aldopentoses)	lyxose	65-42-9
C_{5}H_{10}O_{5} (aldopentoses)	D-lyxose	1114-34-7
C_{5}H_{10}O_{5} (aldopentoses)	L-lyxose	1949-78-6
C_{5}H_{10}O_{5} (aldopentoses)	ribose D-ribose	50-69-1
C_{5}H_{10}O_{5} (aldopentoses)	L-ribose	24259-59-4
C_{5}H_{10}O_{5} (aldopentoses)	xylose	25990-60-7
C_{5}H_{10}O_{5} (aldopentoses)	D-xylose	58-86-6
C_{5}H_{10}O_{5} (aldopentoses)	L-xylose	609-06-3
C_{5}H_{10}O_{5} (ketopentoses)	ribulose	5556-48-9
C_{5}H_{10}O_{5} (ketopentoses)	D-ribulose	488-84-6
C_{5}H_{10}O_{5} (ketopentoses)	L-ribulose	
C_{5}H_{10}O_{5} (ketopentoses)	xylulose	5962-29-8
C_{5}H_{10}O_{5} (ketopentoses)	D-xylulose	
C_{5}H_{10}O_{5} (ketopentoses)	L-xylulose	527-50-4
C_{5}H_{10}O_{5}	1,3,5,7,9-pentaoxecane	16528-92-0
C_{5}H_{10}S	tetrahydro-2-methylthiophene	1795-09-1
C_{5}H_{10}S	tetrahydro-3-methylthiophene	4740-00-5
C_{5}H_{10}S	cyclopentanethiol	1679-07-8
C_{5}H_{10}S	trimethylthiirane	53971-47-4
C_{5}H_{11}	neopentyl radical	3744-21-6
C_{5}H_{11}Br	bromopentane	
C_{5}H_{11}BrO_{2}Si	trimethylsilyl bromoacetate	18291-80-0
C_{5}H_{11}ClHg	isopentyl mercuric chloride	17774-08-2
C_{5}H_{11}ClO_{4}	monochloropentaerythritol	36043-12-6
C_{5}H_{11}ClSi	allylchlorodimethylsilane	4028-23-3
C_{5}H_{11}Cl_{3}Si	trichloropentylsilane	107-72-2
C_{5}H_{11}FO_{4}	monofluoropentaerythritol	36043-13-7
C_{5}H_{11}N	cyclopentanamine	1003-03-8
C_{5}H_{11}N	ethyl propyliden amine	500011-12-1
C_{5}H_{11}N	piperidine	110-89-4
C_{5}H_{11}N	propionaldehyde ethylimine	18328-91-1
C_{5}H_{11}NO	Several compounds	–
C_{5}H_{11}NO_{2}	amyl nitrite	110-46-3
C_{5}H_{11}NO_{2}	amyl nitrite	463-04-7
C_{5}H_{11}NO_{2}	butyl carbamate	592-35-8
C_{5}H_{11}NO_{2}	iso butyl carbamate	543-28-2
C_{5}H_{11}NO_{2}	valine	72-18-4
C_{5}H_{11}NO_{2}S	methionine	59-51-8
C_{5}H_{11}NO_{2}S	penicillamine	52-67-5
C_{5}H_{11}NO_{4}	ammonium acid pyrotartrate	61478-85-1
C_{5}H_{11}NS_{2}	ethyl dithiocarbimidoic acid dimethyl ester	116072-47-0
C_{5}H_{11}N_{2}O_{2}P	tabun	77-81-6
C_{5}H_{11}N_{3}S	piperazine hydrothiocyanate	73373-48-5
C_{5}H_{11}O_{2}	pentyl peroxy radical	52310-21-1
C_{5}H_{11}O_{3}P	dimethyl allylphosphonate	757-54-0
C_{5}H_{11}O_{5}P	trimethyl phosphonoacetate	5927-18-4
C_{5}H_{11}P	phoshorinane	4743-40-2
C_{5}H_{12}	pentane	109-66-0
C_{5}H_{12}ClO_{2}PS_{2}	chlormephos	24934-91-6
C_{5}H_{12}Cl_{2}Si	isobutylmethyldichlorosilane	18147-18-7
C_{5}H_{12}FO_{2}P	butyl methylphosphonofluoridate	352-63-6
C_{5}H_{12}FO_{2}P	isopropyl ethylphosphonofluoridate	1189-87-3
C_{5}H_{12}FO_{2}P	propyl ethylphosphonofluoridate	2992-95-2
C_{5}H_{12}NO_{3}PS_{2}	dimethoate	60-51-5
C_{5}H_{12}NO_{4}PS	omethoate	1113-02-6
C_{5}H_{12}N_{2}	butylmethyldiazene	4426-46-4
C_{5}H_{12}N_{2}	homopiperazine	505-66-8
C_{5}H_{12}N_{2}O	valeric acid hydrazide	38291-82-6
C_{5}H_{12}N_{3}OP	tetramethylphosphorodiamidic cyanide	14445-60-4
C_{5}H_{12}O	isobutyl methyl ether	625-44-5
C_{5}H_{12}O_{2}	diethoxymethane	462-95-3
C_{5}H_{12}O_{2}Si	trimethylsilyl acetate	13411-48-8
C_{5}H_{12}O_{3}Si	vinyltrimethoxysilane	2768-02-7
C_{5}H_{12}O_{4}	tetramethoxymethane	1850-14-2
C_{5}H_{12}O_{5}	adonitol	488-81-3
C_{5}H_{12}O_{5}	xylitol	87-99-0
C_{5}H_{13}BO	diethylmethoxyborane	7397-46-8
C_{5}H_{13}ClSi	propyldimethylchlorosilane	17477-29-1
C_{5}H_{13}N	neopentylamine	5813-64-9
C_{5}H_{13}NO_{2}	methyldiethanolamine	105-59-9
C_{5}H_{13}NO_{4}	monoaminopentaerythritol	36043-15-9
C_{5}H_{13}O_{2}PS	diethyl methylphosphonothioate	6996-81-2
C_{5}H_{13}O_{3}P	diethyl methanephosphonate	683-08-9
C_{5}H_{13}O_{3}P	isopropyl methyl methylphosphonate	690-64-2
C_{5}H_{13}O_{4}P	diethyl hydroxymethylphosphonate	3084-40-0
C_{5}H_{14}Cl_{2}N_{2}O_{2}	ornithine dihydrochloride	6211-16-1
C_{5}H_{14}NO_{6}P	betaine phosphate	58823-88-4
C_{5}H_{14}N_{2}	ethyl trimethylhydrazine	50599-41-2
C_{5}H_{14}N_{2}O_{4}	diaminopentaerythritol	36043-16-0
C_{5}H_{14}O_{2}Si	methyldiethoxysilane	2031-62-1
C_{5}H_{14}O_{3}Si	trimethoxyethylsilane	5314-55-6
C_{5}H_{14}O_{6}P_{2}	tetramethyl methylenediphosphonate	16001-93-7
C_{5}H_{15}As_{5}	pentamethylpentaarsolane	20550-47-4
C_{5}H_{15}N_{2}OP	pentamethylphosphonic diamide	2511-17-3
C_{5}H_{15}Sb	pentamethylantimony	15120-50-0
C_{5}H_{15}Ta	pentamethyl tantalum	53378-72-6
C_{5}H_{16}Cl_{4}MnN_{2}	pentyldiamine manganese tetrachloride	59890-70-9
C_{5}H_{30}Bi_{2}Br_{11}N_{5}	methylammonium bismuth bromide	119931-90-7
C_{5}N_{4}	methanetetracarbonitrile	24331-09-7

== See also ==
- Carbon number
- List of compounds with carbon number 4
- List of compounds with carbon number 6
