= List of compounds with carbon number 19 =

This is a partial list of molecules that contain 19 carbon atoms.

Chemical formula	Synonyms	CAS number
C_{19}H_{11}F_{5}N_{2}O_{2}	diflufenican	83164-33-4
C_{19}H_{13}N_{3}O_{6}	tris(4-nitrophenyl)methane	603-49-6
C_{19}H_{15}Cl	triphenylmethyl chloride	76-83-5
C_{19}H_{15}N_{3}	trityl azide	14309-25-2
C_{19}H_{16}	triphenylmethane	519-73-3
C_{19}H_{16}ClNO_{4}	indomethacin	53-86-1
C_{19}H_{16}F_{4}N_{2}O_{2}	tetflupyrolimet	2053901-33-8
C_{19}H_{16}N_{4}	1,3,5-triphenylformazan	531-52-2
C_{19}H_{16}O	triphenylmethanol	76-84-6
C_{19}H_{16}S	triphenylmethanethiol	3695-77-0
C_{19}H_{17}ClN_{2}O	prazepam	2955-38-6
C_{19}H_{17}ClN_{2}O_{4}	glafenine	3820-67-5
C_{19}H_{17}ClN_{2}O_{4}	quizalofop ethyl	76578-14-8
C_{19}H_{17}N	tritylamine	5824-40-8
C_{19}H_{17}NOS	tolnaftate	2398-96-1
C_{19}H_{17}NO_{2}	naproanilide	51888-81-4
C_{19}H_{17}NO_{2}	neocinchophen	485-34-7
C_{19}H_{17}N_{3}	triphenyl guanidine	603-53-2
C_{19}H_{17}O_{4}P	cresyl diphenylphosphate	26444-49-5
C_{19}H_{18}ClN_{3}O_{3}	camazepam	36104-80-0
C_{19}H_{18}Si	methyltriphenylsilane	791-29-7
C_{19}H_{18}Sn	methyltriphenyltin	1089-59-4
C_{19}H_{19}ClFNO_{3}	flamprop isopropyl	52756-22-6
C_{19}H_{19}N	phenindamine	82-88-2
C_{19}H_{19}N_{7}O_{6}	folic acid	59-30-3
C_{19}H_{20}ClN_{3}	clemizole	442-52-4
C_{19}H_{20}ClN_{3}O_{4}	cyclopyrimorate	499231-24-2
C_{19}H_{20}FNO_{3}	paroxetine	61869-08-7
C_{19}H_{20}F_{3}NO_{2}	benfluorex	23602-78-0
C_{19}H_{20}N_{2}	mebhydrolin	524-81-2
C_{19}H_{20}N_{2}O_{2}	phenylbutazone	50-33-9
C_{19}H_{20}N_{2}O_{3}	oxyphenbutazone	129-20-4
C_{19}H_{21}ClN_{2}O	pencycuron	66063-05-6
C_{19}H_{21}ClN_{2}OS	chloracyzine	800-22-6
C_{19}H_{21}ClO_{8}S	lancotrione	1486617-21-3
C_{19}H_{21}F_{3}N_{2}S	trifluomeprazine	2622-37-9
C_{19}H_{21}N	nortriptyline	72-69-5
C_{19}H_{21}N	protriptyline	438-60-8
C_{19}H_{21}NO_{3}	nalorphine	62-67-9
C_{19}H_{21}NO_{3}	thebaine	115-37-7
C_{19}H_{21}NS	dosulepin	113-53-1
C_{19}H_{21}NS	pizotifen	15574-96-6
C_{19}H_{21}N_{3}O	zolpidem	82626-48-0
C_{19}H_{22}ClN	nortriptyline hydrochloride	894-71-3
C_{19}H_{22}ClN_{5}O	trazodone	19794-93-5
C_{19}H_{22}FN_{3}O	azaperone	1649-18-9
C_{19}H_{22}N_{2}	triprolidine	486-12-4
C_{19}H_{22}N_{2}O	cinchonidine	485-71-2
C_{19}H_{22}N_{2}O	cinchonine	118-10-5
C_{19}H_{22}N_{2}O	noxiptyline	3362-45-6
C_{19}H_{22}N_{2}OS	acepromazine	61-00-7
C_{19}H_{22}N_{2}OS	acepromethazine	13461-01-3
C_{19}H_{22}N_{2}OS	thiazesim	5845-26-1
C_{19}H_{22}N_{2}S	mepazine	60-89-9
C_{19}H_{22}O_{6}	gibberellic acid	77-06-5
C_{19}H_{23}	cyclohexyldiphenylmethane	50585-08-5
C_{19}H_{23}ClN_{2}	chlorimipramine	303-49-1
C_{19}H_{23}ClN_{2}S	chlorproethazine	84-01-5
C_{19}H_{23}NO	diphenylpyralamine	147-20-6
C_{19}H_{23}NO_{3}	ethylmorphine	76-58-4
C_{19}H_{23}N_{3}O_{2}	propyl red	2641-01-2
C_{19}H_{24}	dimesitylmethane	733-07-3
C_{19}H_{24}Cl_{2}N	clomipramine hydrochloride	17321-77-6
C_{19}H_{24}N_{2}	bamipine	4945-47-5
C_{19}H_{24}N_{2}	imipramine	50-49-7
C_{19}H_{24}N_{2}O	cinchonamine	482-28-0
C_{19}H_{24}N_{2}OS	levomepromazine	851-68-3
C_{19}H_{24}N_{2}OS	methotrimeprazine	60-99-1
C_{19}H_{24}N_{2}S	ethopropazine	522-00-9
C_{19}H_{24}N_{2}S_{2}	methiomeprazine	7009-43-0
C_{19}H_{24}O_{2}	linalyl cinnamate	78-37-5
C_{19}H_{24}O_{3}	adrenosterone	382-45-6]
C_{19}H_{25}NO	levallorphan	152-02-3
C_{19}H_{25}NO_{2}	nylidrin	447-41-6
C_{19}H_{25}N_{3}S	proquamezine	58-37-7
C_{19}H_{26}O_{3}	bioallethrin	584-79-2
C_{19}H_{26}O_{7}	diacetoxyscirpenol	2270-40-8
C_{19}H_{27}NO	pentazocine	359-83-1
C_{19}H_{27}NO_{6}	senkirkine	2318-18-5
C_{19}H_{28}BrNO_{3}	glycopyrrolate	58493-54-2
C_{19}H_{28}ClN_{5}O	etoperidone	52942-31-1
C_{19}H_{28}N_{2}	iprindole	5560-72-5
C_{19}H_{28}O_{2}	testosterone	58-22-0
C_{19}H_{28}O_{4}	octyl benzyl succinate	119450-16-7
C_{19}H_{29}NO	procyclidine	77-37-2
C_{19}H_{30}N_{2}O_{3}	fenalamide	4551-59-1
C_{19}H_{30}O_{2}	androsterone	53-41-8
C_{19}H_{30}O_{2}	stanolone	521-18-6
C_{19}H_{30}O_{3}	oxandrolone	53-39-4
C_{19}H_{30}O_{5}	piperonyl butoxide	51-03-6
C_{19}H_{32}	androstane	24887-75-0
C_{19}H_{34}	tricyclohexylmethane	1610-24-8
C_{19}H_{34}O	tricyclohexylmethanol	17687-74-0
C_{19}H_{35}N	perhexiline	6621-47-2
C_{19}H_{35}NO_{2}	dicyclomine	77-19-0
C_{19}H_{36}O_{3}	methyl ricinoleate	141-24-2
C_{19}H_{37}N	nonadecanenitrile	28623-46-3
C_{19}H_{38}O_{2}	ethyl heptadecanoate	14010-23-2
C_{19}H_{38}O_{2}	heptadecyl acetate	822-20-8
C_{19}H_{38}O_{2}	isopropyl palmitate	142-91-6
C_{19}H_{38}O_{2}	nonadecanoic acid	646-30-0
C_{19}H_{38}O_{2}	pristanic acid	1189-37-3
C_{19}H_{38}O_{2}	propyl palmitate	2239-78-3
C_{19}H_{38}O_{3}	hexadecyl lactate	35274-05-6
C_{19}H_{40}	nonadecane	629-92-5
C_{19}H_{40}	pristane	1921-70-6
C_{19}H_{40}Cl_{2}Si	methyloctadecyldichlorosilane	5157-75-5
C_{19}H_{42}BrN	cetrimonium bromide	57-09-0
C_{19}H_{42}ClN	cetrimonium chloride	112-02-7

== See also ==
- Carbon number
- List of compounds with carbon number 18
- List of compounds with carbon number 20
