= C20H20O7 =

The molecular formula C_{20}H_{20}O_{7} (molar mass: 372.36 g/mol, exact mass: 372.120903 u) may refer to:

- Nephroarctin, a depside
- Sinensetin, a methylated flavone
- Tangeritin, a methylated flavone
