= List of compounds with carbon number 23 =

This is a partial list of molecules that contain 23 carbon atoms.

Chemical formula	Synonyms	CAS number
C_{23}H_{15}ClO_{3}	chlorophacinone	3691-35-8
C_{23}H_{16}O_{3}	diphenadione	82-66-6
C_{23}H_{21}ClO_{3}	chlorotrianisene	569-57-3
C_{23}H_{22}O_{6}	rotenone	83-79-4
C_{23}H_{23}IN_{2}S_{2}	dithiazanine iodide	514-73-8
C_{23}H_{25}F_{3}N_{2}OS	flupentixol	2709-56-0
C_{23}H_{25}N	fendiline	13042-18-7
C_{23}H_{25}O_{12}	Several molecules	-
C_{23}H_{26}N_{2}O_{2}	dexetimide	21888-98-2
C_{23}H_{26}N_{2}O_{4}	brucine	357-57-3
C_{23}H_{26}O_{3}	phenothrin	26002-80-2
C_{23}H_{27}NO	deptropine	604-51-3
C_{23}H_{27}NO_{5}	octaverine	549-68-8
C_{23}H_{28}ClN_{3}O_{2}S	thiopropazate	84-06-0
C_{23}H_{28}ClN_{3}O_{5}S	glyburide	10238-21-8
C_{23}H_{29}ClO_{4}	chlormadinone acetate	302-22-7
C_{23}H_{29}N	decylcyanobiphenyl	59454-35-2
C_{23}H_{29}NO	norpipanone	561-48-8
C_{23}H_{29}NO_{2}	phenadoxone	467-84-5
C_{23}H_{29}NO_{2}	pyrroliphene	15686-97-2
C_{23}H_{29}NO_{3}	benzethidine	3691-78-9
C_{23}H_{29}NO_{3}	phenbutrazate	4378-36-3
C_{23}H_{29}NO_{3}	phenoperidine	562-26-5
C_{23}H_{29}N_{3}O_{2}S_{2}	thiothixene	5591-45-7
C_{23}H_{30}N_{2}O_{2}	piminodine	13495-09-5
C_{23}H_{30}N_{2}O_{4}	pholcodine	509-67-1
C_{23}H_{31}ClN_{2}O_{3}	etodroxizine	17692-34-1
C_{23}H_{31}NO_{2}	alphacetylmethadol	17199-58-5
C_{23}H_{32}N_{2}O_{3}	zipeprol	34758-83-3
C_{23}H_{32}N_{2}O_{4}	pinoxaden	243973-20-8
C_{23}H_{32}O_{6}	hydrocortisone acetate	50-03-3
C_{23}H_{33}N_{2}O_{2}	prajmaline	35080-11-6
C_{23}H_{36}O_{3}	dromostanolone propionate	521-12-0
C_{23}H_{38}N_{7}O_{17}P_{3}S	acetyl-CoA	72-89-9
C_{23}H_{42}ClNO_{2}	benzoxonium chloride	19379-90-9
C_{23}H_{42}O_{3}	tetrahydrofurfuryl oleate	150-81-2
C_{23}H_{44}O_{4}	diethyl hexadecylmalonate	41433-81-2
C_{23}H_{44}O_{4}	monostearyl glutarate	20011-41-0
C_{23}H_{45}N	tricosanenitrile	95491-05-7
C_{23}H_{46}O_{2}	tricosanoic acid	2433-96-7
C_{23}H_{47}N	tetracosanenitrile	95804-62-9

== See also ==
- Carbon number
- List of compounds with carbon number 22
- List of compounds with carbon number 24
