= Lancotrione =

Weed control herbicide

Names
- Preferred IUPAC name 2-[2-chloro-3-[2-(1,3-dioxolan-2-yl)ethoxy]-4-methylsulfonylbenzoyl]cyclohexane-1,3-dione

Identifiers
CAS Number	1486617-21-3
3D model (JSmol)	Interactive image
ChemSpider	9786774
PubChem CID	11612020
UNII	KMQ9P5LG22
- InChI: InChI=1S/C19H21ClO8S/c1-29(24,25)14-6-5-11(18(23)16-12(21)3-2-4-13(16)22)17(20)19(14)28-8-7-15-26-9-10-27-15/h5-6,15,21H,2-4,7-10H2,1H3 Key: YYRPFCKCSGLKJS-UHFFFAOYSA-N
- SMILES: CS(=O)(=O)C1=C(C(=C(C=C1)C(=O)C2C(=O)CCCC2=O)Cl)OCCC3OCCO3

Properties
Chemical formula	C_{19}H_{21}ClO_{8}S
Molar mass	444.88 g·mol^{−1}
Density	1.47

Related compounds
Related compounds	tefuryltrione
- Except where otherwise noted, data are given for materials in their standard state (at 25 °C [77 °F], 100 kPa). Infobox references

Lancotrione is a herbicide, closely related to tefuryltrione. Its mode of action inhibits 4-hydroxyphenylpyruvate dioxygenase (HPPD), an enzyme which produces homogentisic acid.

It was announced by Ishihara Sangyo Kaisha in 2016, and commercialised in 2019. Lancotrione is a new herbicide, usually used in the form of sodium salt to control grass weeds, in rice crops. As such, little is yet known about it.

== Synthesis ==
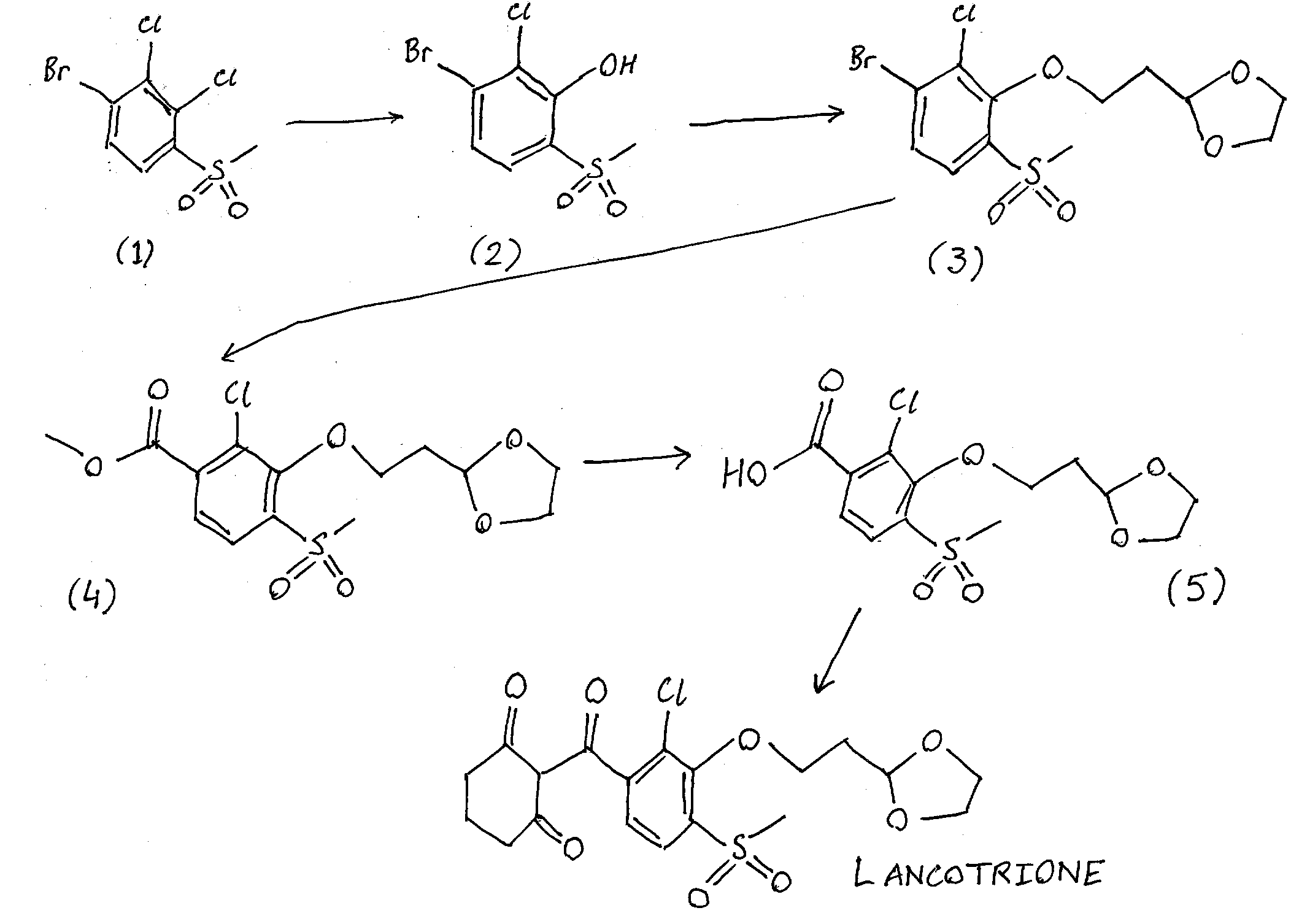
Synthesis of lancotrione

It starts from 1-bromo-2,3-dichloro-4-methylsulfonylbenzene, (1), which is then refluxed with sodium hydroxide in tert-butanol. (2) This is alkylated with 2-(2-chloroethyl)-1,3-dioxolane under basic conditions, (3), converted in a palladium-catalysed carbonylation to a methyl ester, (4). The ester is then saponified, and the consequent benzoic acid derivative, (5), with O-acylation of 1,3-cyclohexanedione and subsequent cyanide-catalyzed rearrangement, makes lancotrione.

== Links ==
Lancotrione in the Pesticide Properties DataBase (PPDB)
