= Flupropanate =

Names
- IUPAC name 2,2,3,3-Tetrafluoropropanoic acid
- Other names Trade name: tetrapion

Identifiers
CAS Number	756-09-2
3D model (JSmol)	Interactive image
ChEBI	CHEBI:82013
ChemSpider	62988
ECHA InfoCard	100.010.954
EC Number	212-049-7
KEGG	C18854
PubChem CID	69789
UNII	376KS3J2Q6
CompTox Dashboard (EPA)	DTXSID7058177
- InChI: InChI=1S/C3H2F4O2/c4-1(5)3(6,7)2(8)9/h1H,(H,8,9) Key: PXRROZVNOOEPPZ-UHFFFAOYSA-N
- SMILES: C(C(C(=O)O)(F)F)(F)F

Properties
Chemical formula	C_{3}H_{2}F_{4}O_{2}
Molar mass	146.041 g·mol^{−1}

Hazards
- GHS labelling
Pictograms	(GHS05: Corrosive)
Signal word	Danger
Hazard statements	H314
Precautionary statements	P260, P264, P280, P301+P330+P331, P302+P361+P354, P304+P340, P305+P354+P338, P316, P321, P363, P405, P501
- Except where otherwise noted, data are given for materials in their standard state (at 25 °C [77 °F], 100 kPa). Infobox references

Flupropanate is a synthetic organofluorine compound belonging to the class of halogenated alkanoic acids. It is used as a systemic herbicide. The sodium salt, flupropanate-sodium, is commonly used in commercial formulations to improve water solubility.

Flupropanate was approved for use in Australia in 1975 where it is used to control the grasses serrated tussock (Nassella trichotoma), giant rat's tail grass (Sporobolus spp.), African lovegrass (Eragrostis curvula), parramatta grass (Sporobolus fertilis), and Chilean needle grass (Nassella neesiana). It has also been used to control invasive forms of bamboo.
