= Cyclohexyl hydroperoxide =

Chemical compound

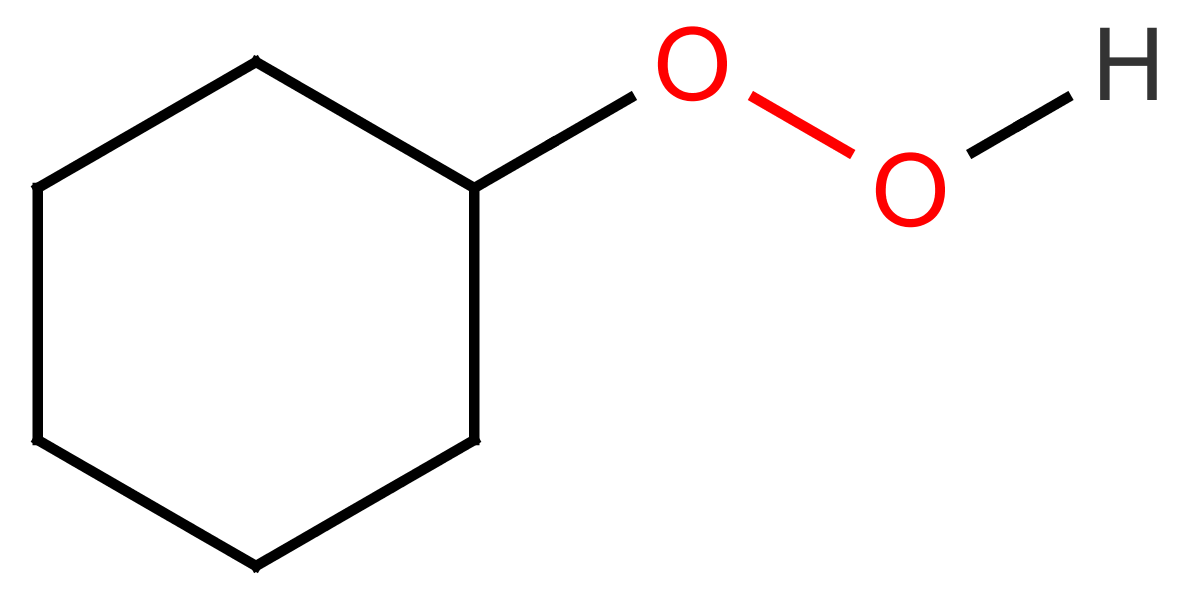

Names
- IUPAC name hydroperoxycyclohexane
- Other names: CHHP; Cyclohexane hydroperoxide

Identifiers
CAS Number	766-07-4
3D model (JSmol)	Interactive image
ChemSpider	63032
ECHA InfoCard	100.011.053
EC Number	212-159-5
PubChem CID	69835
UNII	ZR4UH5MC4C
UN number	9183
CompTox Dashboard (EPA)	DTXSID90227401
- InChI: InChI=1S/C6H12O2/c7-8-6-4-2-1-3-5-6/h6-7H,1-5H2; InChI=1S/C6H12O2/c7-8-6-4-2-1-3-5-6/h6-7H,1-5H2
- SMILES: C1CCC(CC1)OO

Properties
Chemical formula	C_{6}H_{12}O_{2}
Molar mass	116.160 g·mol^{−1}
Appearance	Colorless
Density	1.02 g/cm^{3}
Melting point	−20 °C (−4 °F; 253 K)
Boiling point	200 °C (392 °F; 473 K)

Hazards
- GHS labelling
Pictograms	(GHS05: Corrosive) (GHS07: Exclamation mark)
Signal word	Danger
Hazard statements	H302, H314
Precautionary statements	P260, P264, P264+P265, P270, P280, P301+P317, P301+P330+P331, P302+P361+P354, P304+P340, P305+P354+P338, P316, P317, P321, P330, P363, P405, P501
- Except where otherwise noted, data are given for materials in their standard state (at 25 °C [77 °F], 100 kPa). Infobox references

Cyclohexyl hydroperoxide (CHHP) is an organic hydroperoxide that is typically used to assist in industrially producing cyclohexanol and cyclohexanone. These compounds are then usually turned into the polymer nylon 6 (polycaprolactam). It has no color and is transparent when pure. It was first synthesized and prepared in 1930 by two German chemists, and has since been used for other modern industrial production.

== Properties ==
In its pure form, the compound appears as a colorless and transparent liquid, with a distinct garlic smell. It is corrosive and irritation hazard. Although organic peroxides are generally unstable, cyclohexyl hydroperoxide only decomposes slowly.

== Preparation and synthesis ==
The first known method of synthesizing the compound was published in 1930 by chemists Stoll and Scherrer, in which the authors detailed a method to produce 1-hydroxy-cyclohexyl-hydroperoxide-1, a related compound. This involved using peroxymonosulfuric acid to convert cyclic ketone into its corresponding lactone. They proceeded to use ozone and hydrogen peroxide and allowed it to oxidize for several days, then examined it again. They had discovered they had now produced the new oxygen-rich cyclanone peroxides they desired.

More recent synthetic methods involve oxidation of cyclohexane. The reaction is prone to over-oxidation, leading at furst to KA oil (a mixture of cyclohexanol and cyclohexanone), which might then get further oxidized.
