= C5H11NO =

The molecular formula C_{5}H_{11}NO (molar mass: 101.15 g/mol) may refer to:

- Diethylformamide
- N-Hydroxypiperidine
- Isovaleramide
- N-Methylmorpholine
- Pivalamide
- Prolinol
