= Heptanoyl chloride =

Names
- Preferred IUPAC name Heptanoyl chloride
- Other names Enanthyl chloride; n-Heptanoyl chloride; Enanthic chloride; Oenanthic chloride

Identifiers
CAS Number	2528-61-2
3D model (JSmol)	Interactive image
ChemSpider	16383
ECHA InfoCard	100.017.978
EC Number	219-775-3
PubChem CID	17313
UNII	Z2P33BJ4B5
CompTox Dashboard (EPA)	DTXSID8062496
- InChI: InChI=1S/C7H13ClO/c1-2-3-4-5-6-7(8)9/h2-6H2,1H3 Key: UCVODTZQZHMTPN-UHFFFAOYSA-N
- SMILES: CCCCCCC(=O)Cl

Properties
Chemical formula	C_{7}H_{13}ClO
Molar mass	148.63 g·mol^{−1}

Hazards
- GHS labelling
Pictograms	(GHS05: Corrosive) (GHS06: Toxic)
Signal word	Danger
Hazard statements	H290, H314, H330
Precautionary statements	P234, P260, P264, P264+P265, P271, P280, P284, P301+P330+P331, P302+P361+P354, P304+P340, P305+P354+P338, P316, P317, P320, P321, P363, P390, P403+P233, P405, P501
- Except where otherwise noted, data are given for materials in their standard state (at 25 °C [77 °F], 100 kPa). Infobox references

Heptanoyl chloride is a seven-carbon acyl chloride with a straight-chain structure that is used as a reagent in organic synthesis.
