= C23H25O12 =

The molecular formula C_{23}H_{25}O_{12} (or C_{23}H_{25}O_{12}^{+} or C_{23}H_{25}ClO_{12}, molar mass: 493.43 g/mol (528.89 g/mol for chloride), exact mass: 493.13460119 (528.103454 (for chloride)) may refer to:

- Primulin (anthocyanin), an anthocyanin
- Oenin, an anthocyanin
