= Metofoline =

Chemical compound

Clinical data
- ATC code: none

Legal status
- Legal status: ?

Identifiers
- IUPAC name: 1-[2-(4-Chlorophenyl)ethyl]-6,7-dimethoxy-2-methyl-1,2,3,4-tetrahydroisoquinoline
- CAS Number: 2154-02-1 63937-57-5 (4'-nitromethopholine)
- PubChem CID: 16538
- ChemSpider: 15678
- UNII: 72L4ZT2W1P
- KEGG: D04986
- CompTox Dashboard (EPA): DTXSID90862851

Chemical and physical data
- Formula: C_{20}H_{24}ClNO_{2}
- Molar mass: 345.87 g·mol^{−1}
- 3D model (JSmol): Interactive image
- SMILES: ClC1=CC=C(CCC2C3=CC(OC)=C(OC)C=C3CCN2C)C=C1
- InChI: InChI=1S/C20H24ClNO2/c1-22-11-10-15-12-19(23-2)20(24-3)13-17(15)18(22)9-6-14-4-7-16(21)8-5-14/h4-5,7-8,12-13,18H,6,9-11H2,1-3H3; Key:YBCPYHQFUMNOJG-UHFFFAOYSA-N

Metofoline (INN), also known as methofoline (USAN), is an opioid analgesic drug discovered in the 1950s by a team of Swiss researchers at Hoffmann-La Roche.

Methopholine is an isoquinoline derivative which is not structurally related to most other opioids. However, its structural similarity to the non-opioid alkaloid papaverine is notable.

Metofoline has around the same efficacy as an analgesic as codeine, and was evaluated for the treatment of postoperative pain. Metofoline tablets were marketed in the United States under the brand name of Versidyne, but the drug was withdrawn from the market in 1965 due to the occurrence of ophthalmic side-effects alongside the discovery that the drug could produce cataracts in dogs.

Metofoline has two enantiomers, with the levo (R) enantiomer being the active form, around 3x the potency of codeine, and the (S) enantiomer being inactive.

Analogs where the 4'-chloro group has been replaced by other electron withdrawing groups have also been tested, the fluoro derivative being slightly more potent than chloro, and the nitro derivative being most potent of all, with the racemic 4'-nitromethopholine being around 20x the potency of codeine.

Later research was carried out by Bristol-Myer in the 1960s and animal studies suggested derivatives with significantly increased analgesic activity of over x50 codeine.

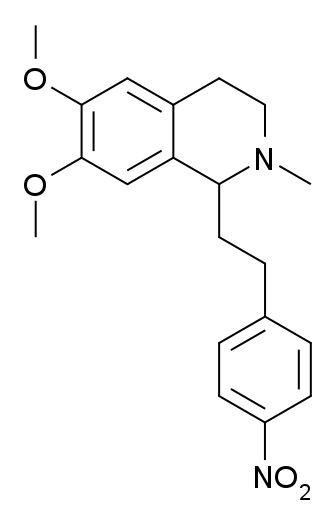
4'-Nitro analog of metopholine

== See also ==
- Almorexant
- Papaverine
