= C22H22O11 =

The molecular formula C_{22}H_{22}O_{11} (molar mass: 462.40 g/mol, exact mass: 462.1162 u) may refer to:

- Azalein, a flavonol
- Leptosin, a glycoside
- Tectoridin, an isoflavone
