= List of compounds with carbon number 7 =

This is a partial list of molecules that contain 7 carbon atoms.

Chemical formula	Synonyms	CAS number
C_{7}ClF_{5}O	pentafluorobenzoyl chloride	2251–50–5
C_{7}F_{5}NS	pentafluorophenyl isothiocyanate	35923–79–6
C_{7}F_{14}	perfluoromethylcyclohexane	355–02–2
C_{7}HF_{5}O	pentafluorobenzaldehyde	653–37–2
C_{7}H_{3}IN_{2}O_{3}	nitroxynil	1689–89–0
C_{7}H_{3}Br_{2}NO	bromoxynil	1689–84–5
C_{7}H_{3}Cl_{2}NO	chloroxynil	1891–95–8
C_{7}H_{3}I_{2}NO	ioxynil	1689–83–4
C_{7}H_{4}ClFO	2-chloro-6-fluorobenzaldehyde	387-45-1
C_{7}H_{4}ClNO_{2}	chloroxazone	95–25–0
C_{7}H_{4}CrO_{3}S	thiophene chromium tricarbonyl	12078–15–8
C_{7}H_{4}CrO_{3}Se	selenophene chromium tricarbonyl	12078–16–9
C_{7}H_{4}CrO_{3}Te	tellurophene chromium tricarbonyl	39015–36–6
C_{7}H_{4}MnNO_{3}	azacymantrene	32761–36–7
C_{7}H_{4}O_{3}S	tioxolone	4991–65–5
C_{7}H_{4}O_{7}	meconic acid	497–59–6
C_{7}H_{5}BrO	Several compounds	–
C_{7}H_{5}ClCrO_{5}S	methyl chloromethyl sulfide chromium pentacarbonyl	65338–63–8
C_{7}H_{5}ClFeO_{2}	cyclopentadienylirondicarbonylchloride	12107–04–9
C_{7}H_{5}ClN_{2}O	zoxazolamine	61–80–3
C_{7}H_{5}ClN_{2}O_{3}	aklomide	3011–89–0
C_{7}H_{5}ClO	benzoyl chloride	98–88–4
C_{7}H_{5}FN_{2}O_{4}	fluorodinitrophenylmethane	17003–70–2
C_{7}H_{5}FO	benzoyl fluoride	455–32–3
C_{7}H_{5}F_{3}O	trifluoromethoxybenzene	456–55–3
C_{7}H_{5}F_{3}S	phenyl trifluoromethyl sulfide	456–56–4
C_{7}H_{5}FeIO_{2}	cyclopentadienyliron dicarboxyl iodide	12078–28–3
C_{7}H_{5}FeNO_{3}	aminocyclobutadieneiron tricarbonyl	33039–25–7
C_{7}H_{5}IO	benzoyl iodide	618–38–2
C_{7}H_{5}IO_{2}	Iodobenzoic acid	
C_{7}H_{5}IO_{4}	2-Iodoxybenzoic acid	61717–82–6
C_{7}H_{5}MoNO_{3}	cyclopentadienylmolybdenum dicarbonyl nitrosyl	12128–13–1
C_{7}H_{5}N	benzonitrile	100–47–0
C_{7}H_{5}NO	benzoxazole	273–53–0
C_{7}H_{5}NO_{2}	benzoxazolone	59–49–4
C_{7}H_{5}NO_{3}S	benzenesulfonyl isocyanate	2845–62–7
C_{7}H_{5}NO_{3}S	saccharin	81–07–2
C_{7}H_{5}NS	phenylisothiocyanate	103–72–0
C_{7}H_{5}NS	benzothiazole	95–16–9
C_{7}H_{5}NSe	benzoselenazole	273–91–6
C_{7}H_{5}N_{3}O_{6}	trinitrotoluene	118–96–7
C_{7}H_{6}ClN_{3}O_{4}S_{2}	chlorothiazide	58–94–6
C_{7}H_{6}F_{6}O_{2}	hexafluoroisopropyl methacrylate	3063–94–3
C_{7}H_{6}N_{2}	phenyldiazomethane	766–91–6
C_{7}H_{6}O	benzaldehyde	100–52–7
C_{7}H_{6}OS	benzenecarbothioic acid	98–91–9
C_{7}H_{6}O_{2}	benzoic acid	65–85–0
C_{7}H_{6}O_{2}	formic acid phenyl ester	1864–94–4
C_{7}H_{6}O_{3}	perbenzoic acid	93–59–4
C_{7}H_{6}O_{3}	sesamol	533–31–3
C_{7}H_{6}O_{6}S	sulfosalicylic acid	75981–55–4
C_{7}H_{7}	benzyl radical	2154–56–5
C_{7}H_{7}	cycloheptatrienyl radical	3551–27–7
C_{7}H_{7}Cl	benzyl chloride	100–44–7
C_{7}H_{7}Cl	chlorotoluene	25168–05–2
C_{7}H_{7}Br	bromotoluene	
C_{7}H_{7}I	iodotoluene	
C_{7}H_{7}ClO_{2}S	benzenemethanesulfonyl chloride	1939–99–7
C_{7}H_{7}F_{5}O_{3}	ethyl pentafluoropropanoyl acetate	663–35–4
C_{7}H_{7}IrO_{4}	dicarbonylacetylacetonato iridium	14023–80–4
C_{7}H_{7}NO	benzamide	55–21–0
C_{7}H_{7}NO	benzamide	27208–38–4
C_{7}H_{7}NO_{2}	anthranilic acid	118–92–3
C_{7}H_{7}NO_{2}	4-aminobenzoic acid	150–13–0
C_{7}H_{7}NO_{2}	benzyl nitrite	935–05–7
C_{7}H_{7}NO_{2}	methyl nicotinate	93–60–7
C_{7}H_{7}NO_{2}	trigonelline	535–83–1
C_{7}H_{7}NO_{3}	4-aminosalicylic acid	65–49–6
C_{7}H_{7}NO_{3}	mesalamine	89–57–6
C_{7}H_{7}NS	benzenecarbothioamide	2227–79–4
C_{7}H_{8}	norcaradiene	14515–09–4
C_{7}H_{8}	quadricyclane	278–06–8
C_{7}H_{8}	toluene	108–88–3
C_{7}H_{8}AsMnO_{2}	arsinecyclopentadienylmanganese dicarbonyl	33292–28–3
C_{7}H_{8}FO_{2}P	phenyl methylphosphonofluoridate	133826–40–1
C_{7}H_{8}F_{2}Si	phenyl methyl difluorosilane	328–57–4
C_{7}H_{8}N_{2}	isopropenylpyrazine	38713–41–6
C_{7}H_{8}N_{2}O	acetonylprazine	6784–62–9
C_{7}H_{8}N_{2}O	methyl iminopicolinate	19547–38–7
C_{7}H_{8}N_{4}O_{2}	theophylline	5967–84–0
C_{7}H_{8}O	benzyl alcohol	100–51–6
C_{7}H_{8}O	cresol	1319–77–3
C_{7}H_{8}O	nortricyclone	695–05–6
C_{7}H_{8}O_{2}	mequinol	150–76–5
C_{7}H_{8}O_{2}	salicyl alcohol	90–01–7
C_{7}H_{8}O_{3}	ethyl furoate	1335–40–6
C_{7}H_{8}O_{3}	flamenol	2174–64–3
C_{7}H_{8}S	benzenemethanethiol	100–53–8
C_{7}H_{8}Se	methylseleno benzene	4346–64–9
C_{7}H_{9}Br	nortricyclyl bromide	695–02–3
C_{7}H_{9}ClO	ethchlorvynol	113–18–8
C_{7}H_{9}FSi	methylphenylfluorosilane	18720–42–8
C_{7}H_{9}N	benzylamine	100–46–9
C_{7}H_{9}N	N-methylaniline	100–61–8
C_{7}H_{9}NO_{2}	ammonium benzoate	1863–63–4
C_{7}H_{9}NO_{2}	ethylmethyl maleimide	29720–92–1
C_{7}H_{9}NO_{2}S	methanesulfanilide	1197–22–4
C_{7}H_{9}NO_{4}S	dimethyl isothiocyanatosuccinate	121928–38–9
C_{7}H_{9}N_{3}O_{3}S	sulfacarbamide	547–44–4
C_{7}H_{10}	cyclopentyl acetylene	54140–30–6
C_{7}H_{10}	cyclopentylacetylene	930–51–8
C_{7}H_{10}	nortricyclene	279–19–6
C_{7}H_{10}Br_{2}O_{4}	diethyl dibromomalonate	631–22–1
C_{7}H_{10}ClN	phenylmethylammonium chloride	3287–99–8
C_{7}H_{10}Cl_{2}O_{2}	pimeloylchloride	142–79–0
C_{7}H_{10}N_{2}	benzylhydrazine	555–96–4
C_{7}H_{10}N_{2}	diallylcyanamide	538–08–9
C_{7}H_{10}N_{2}	heptanedinitrile	646–20–8
C_{7}H_{10}N_{2}	isopropylpyrazine	9820–90–0
C_{7}H_{10}N_{2}	propylpyrazine	18138–03–9
C_{7}H_{10}N_{2}O_{2}S	carbimazole	22232–54–8
C_{7}H_{10}N_{2}O_{2}S	mafenide	138–39–6
C_{7}H_{10}N_{2}O_{3}	isopropylbarbituric acid	7391–69–7
C_{7}H_{10}N_{2}O_{3}	phenylmethylammonium nitrate	49580–44–1
C_{7}H_{10}N_{4}O_{2}S	sulfaguanidine	57–67–0
C_{7}H_{10}O_{2}	dimethylvinylethynylhydroperoxide	14906–26–4
C_{7}H_{10}O_{3}	diallyl carbonate	15022–08–9
C_{7}H_{10}O_{3}	resorcinol monohydrate	6153–39–5
C_{7}H_{10}O_{5}	shikimic acid	138–59–0
C_{7}H_{10}O_{6}	trimethyl methanetricarboxylate	1186–73–8
C_{7}H_{10}Si	methylphenylsilane	766–08–5
C_{7}H_{11}ClO	cyclohexanecarbonyl chloride	2719–27–9
C_{7}H_{11}ClO_{3}	hexanedioic acid monochloride monomethyl ester	35444–44–1
C_{7}H_{11}ClSi	cyclopentadienyl dimethyl chlorosilane	13688–59–0
C_{7}H_{11}Cl_{3}O_{2}	pentyl trichloroacetate	33972–81–5
C_{7}H_{11}FO_{4}	diethyl fluoromalonate	685–88–1
C_{7}H_{11}F_{3}	trifluoromethylcyclohexane	401–75–2
C_{7}H_{11}F_{3}O_{2}	isopentyl trifluoroacetate	327–69–5
C_{7}H_{11}N	cyclohexanecarbonitrile	766–05–2
C_{7}H_{11}N	cyclohexyl isocyanide	931–53–3
C_{7}H_{11}NO	cyclohexylisocyanate	3173–53–3
C_{7}H_{11}NO	dicyclopropyl ketoxime	1453–52–7
C_{7}H_{11}NO_{2}	ethosuximide	77–67–8
C_{7}H_{11}NS	cyclohexyl isothiocyanate	1122–82–3
C_{7}H_{11}N_{7}S	aziprotryne	4658–28–0
C_{7}H_{12}	cycloheptene	628–92–2
C_{7}H_{12}	ethylidenecyclopentane	2146–37–4
C_{7}H_{12}	norbornane	279–23–2
C_{7}H_{12}	tetramethylcyclopropene	26385–95–5
C_{7}H_{12}Cl_{2}O_{2}	pentyl dichloroacetate	37079–03–1
C_{7}H_{12}N_{2}O_{2}	ectylurea	95–04–5
C_{7}H_{12}O	allyl methallyl ether	14289–96–4
C_{7}H_{12}O	cycloheptanone	502–42–1
C_{7}H_{12}O	cyclohexanecarboxaldehyde	2043–61–0
C_{7}H_{12}O	dicyclopropyl carbinol	14300–33–5
C_{7}H_{12}O	methycyclohexanone	1331–22–2
C_{7}H_{12}O_{2}	cyclohexanecarboxylic acid	98–89–5
C_{7}H_{12}O_{2}	cyclopentaneacetic acid	1123–00–8
C_{7}H_{12}O_{2}	ethyl cyclobutanecarboxylate	14924–53–9
C_{7}H_{12}O_{2}	ethyl tiglate	5837–78–5
C_{7}H_{12}O_{2}	heptanolactone	539–87–7
C_{7}H_{12}O_{2}	propargylaldehyde diethyl acetal	10160–87–9
C_{7}H_{12}O_{3}	butyl pyruvate	20279–44–1
C_{7}H_{12}O_{3}	ethyl propionylacetate	4949–44–4
C_{7}H_{12}O_{3}	ethylpropionyl acetate	15224–07–4
C_{7}H_{12}O_{3}	glycidyl butyrate	2461–40–7
C_{7}H_{12}O_{4}	butylmalonic acid	534–59–8
C_{7}H_{12}O_{4}	dimethyl ethylmalonate	26717–67–9
C_{7}H_{12}O_{4}	dimethyl pentanedioate	1119–40–0
C_{7}H_{12}O_{4}	dimethylpropanedioic acid dimethyl ester	6065–54–9
C_{7}H_{12}O_{4}	heptanedioic acid	111–16–0
C_{7}H_{12}O_{4}	trimethyl butanedioic acid	2103–16–4
C_{7}H_{12}O_{6}Si	methyltriacetoxysilane	4253–34–3
C_{7}H_{12}S	butyl propargyl sulfide	17277–57–5
C_{7}H_{12}Si	methyltrivinylsilane	18244–95–6
C_{7}H_{13}BrO_{2}	pentyl bromoacetate	52034–03–4
C_{7}H_{13}ClHg	mercuric chloride	33631–63–9
C_{7}H_{13}ClO	heptanoyl chloride	2528–61–2
C_{7}H_{13}ClO_{2}	hexyl chloroformate	6092–54–2
C_{7}H_{13}LiO_{2}	lithium heptanoate	16761–13–0
C_{7}H_{13}N	diethylpropargylamine	4079–68–9
C_{7}H_{13}N	heptanenitrile	629–08–3
C_{7}H_{13}N	methyldiallylamine	2424–01–3
C_{7}H_{13}N	quinuclidine	100–76–5
C_{7}H_{13}NO	cyclohexanecarboxamide	1122–56–1
C_{7}H_{13}NS	hexyl isothiocyanate	4404–45–9
C_{7}H_{13}N_{3}O_{3}S	oxamyl	23135–22–0
C_{7}H_{13}O_{2}Tl	thallium heptanoate	34244–91–2
C_{7}H_{13}O_{6}P	dimethylvinphos	2274–67–1
C_{7}H_{13}O_{6}P	mevinphos	7786–34–7
C_{7}H_{14}	cycloheptane	291–64–5
C_{7}H_{14}	isopropylcyclobutane	872–56–0
C_{7}H_{14}Cl_{2}Si	cyclohexylmethyldichlorosilane	5578–42–7
C_{7}H_{14}FOPS	cyclohexyl methylphosphonothionofluoridate	4241–34–3
C_{7}H_{14}NO_{3}PS_{2}	phosfolan	947–02–4
C_{7}H_{14}NO_{5}P	monocrotophos	6923–22–4
C_{7}H_{14}N_{2}	diisopropylcyanamide	3085–76–5
C_{7}H_{14}N_{2}O_{2}S	aldicarb	116–06–3
C_{7}H_{14}N_{2}O_{2}S	butocarboxim	34681–10–2
C_{7}H_{14}N_{2}O_{4}	methylenediurethane	3693–53–6
C_{7}H_{14}N_{2}O_{4}S	aldicarb sulfone	1646–88–4
C_{7}H_{14}N_{2}O_{4}S	butoxycarboxim	34681–23–7
C_{7}H_{14}O	cycloheptanol	502–41–0
C_{7}H_{14}O	cyclohexanemethanol	100–49–2
C_{7}H_{14}O	heptanal	111–71–7
C_{7}H_{14}O	methyl cyclohexanol	25639–42–3
C_{7}H_{14}O	oxocane	6572–98–1
C_{7}H_{14}O	vinylisopentyl ether	39782–38–2
C_{7}H_{14}O_{2}	heptanoic acid	111–14–8
C_{7}H_{14}O_{4}	trimethoxymethyl allyl ether	154016–62–3
C_{7}H_{14}O_{6}	pinitol	484–68–4
C_{7}H_{14}S	heptamethylenesulfide	6572–99–2
C_{7}H_{15}N	allyldiethylamine	5666–17–1
C_{7}H_{15}N	cycloheptylamine	5452–35–7
C_{7}H_{15}N	nanofin	504–03–0
C_{7}H_{15}N	octahydroazocine	1121–92–2
C_{7}H_{15}NO_{2}	emylcamate	78–28–4
C_{7}H_{15}NO_{2}	ethyl diethylcarbamate	3553–80–8
C_{7}H_{15}NO_{2}	hexyl carbamate	2114–20–7
C_{7}H_{15}NO_{2}	neopentylglycine	106247–35–2
C_{7}H_{15}NS_{2}	diisopropyldithiocarbamic acid	25022–55–3
C_{7}H_{15}NS_{2}	dipropyldithiocarbamic acid	25179–61–7
C_{7}H_{15}O_{2}	heptyl peroxy radical	20682–80–8
C_{7}H_{16}	heptane	142–82–5
C_{7}H_{16}FO_{2}P	hexyl methylphosphonofluoridate	113548–89–3
C_{7}H_{16}FO_{2}P	pentyl ethylphosphonofluoridate	162085–84–9
C_{7}H_{16}FO_{2}P	soman	96–64–0
C_{7}H_{16}O_{2}S	diethoxy ethylthiomethane	25604–63–1
C_{7}H_{16}O_{3}	ethyl orthoformate	122–51–0
C_{7}H_{16}O_{3}	methoxyacetaldehyde diethyl acetal	4819–75–4
C_{7}H_{16}O_{3}	propyl carbitol	6881–94–3
C_{7}H_{16}O_{3}	triethoxymethane	108055–42–1
C_{7}H_{16}O_{3}	trimethyl orthobutyrate	43083–12–1
C_{7}H_{16}O_{4}S_{2}	sulfonal	115–24–2
C_{7}H_{17}N	ethylisobutylmethylamine	60247–14–5
C_{7}H_{17}N	tuaminoheptane	123–82–0
C_{7}H_{17}NO_{3}	polyglycolamine	112–33–4
C_{7}H_{17}O_{2}PS_{3}	phorate	298–02–2
C_{7}H_{17}O_{3}P	diethyl propylphosphonate	18812–51–6
C_{7}H_{17}O_{3}P	diisopropyl methylphosphonate	1445–75–6
C_{7}H_{18}NO_{3}P	ethyl isopropyl dimethylphosphoramidate	99520–56–6
C_{7}H_{18}N_{2}	butyltrimethylhydrazine	52598–10–4
C_{7}H_{18}OSi	methoxytriethylsilane	2117–34–2
C_{7}H_{18}O_{3}Si	prosil 178	18395–30–7
C_{7}H_{18}O_{3}Si	trimethoxybutylsilane	1067–57–8
C_{7}H_{18}Sn	butyltrimethylstannane	1527–99–7
C_{7}H_{19}O_{3}PSi	isopropyl trimethylsilyl methylphosphonate	199116–08–0
C_{7}H_{20}Si_{2}	ethylpentamethyldisilane	15063–64–6
C_{7}H_{3}Cl_{5}	pentachlorotoluene	877–11–2
C_{7}H_{3}Br_{5}	pentabromotoluene	87–83–2
C_{7}H_{3}F_{5}	pentafluorotoluene	771–56–2

== See also ==
- Carbon number
- List of compounds with carbon number 6
- List of compounds with carbon number 8
