= List of compounds with carbon number 22 =

This is a partial list of molecules that contain 22 carbon atoms.

Chemical formula	Synonyms	CAS number
C_{22}H_{10}O_{2}	Anthanthrone	641-13-4
C_{22}H_{14}	Pentacene	135-48-8
C_{22}H_{17}ClN_{2}	Clotrimazole	23593-75-1
C_{22}H_{17}F_{25}O_{2}	Perfluorododecyl hexylene methacrylate	138245-45-1
C_{22}H_{18}O_{4}	Dibenzyl phthalate	523-31-9
C_{22}H_{19}Br_{2}NO_{3}	Deltamethrin	62229-77-0
C_{22}H_{19}Cl_{2}NO_{3}	Alphamethrin	97955-44-7
C_{22}H_{19}NO_{4}	bisacodyl	603-50-9
C_{22}H_{20}O_{11}	Oroxindin	51059-44-0
C_{22}H_{20}O_{13}	carminic acid	1260-17-9
C_{22}H_{22}FN_{3}O_{2}	droperidol	548-73-2
C_{22}H_{22}O_{9}	Ononin	486-62-4
C_{22}H_{22}O_{11}	Several molecules	-
C_{22}H_{23}F_{4}NO_{2}	trifluperidol	749-13-3
C_{22}H_{23}NO_{7}	narcotine alkaloid	128-62-1
C_{22}H_{24}FN_{3}O_{2}	benperidol	2062-84-2
C_{22}H_{24}F_{3}N_{3}O_{2}S	Ftorpropazine	33414-36-7
C_{22}H_{25}NO_{6}	colchicine	64-86-8
C_{22}H_{26}FNO_{2}	moperone	1050-79-9
C_{22}H_{26}F_{3}N_{3}OS	fluphenazine	69-23-8
C_{22}H_{26}N_{2}O_{2}	vinpocetine	42971-09-5
C_{22}H_{26}O_{3}	resmethrin	10453-86-8
C_{22}H_{26}O_{12}	Arbutin pentaacetate	14698-56-7
C_{22}H_{27}NO	phenazocine	127-35-5
C_{22}H_{27}NO_{2}	amineptine	57574-09-1
C_{22}H_{27}NO_{3}	dioxaphetyl butyrate	467-86-7
C_{22}H_{28}Cl_{2}N_{2}O	lorcainide	59729-31-6
C_{22}H_{28}N_{2}O	fentanyl	437-38-7
C_{22}H_{28}N_{2}O_{2}	anileridine	144-14-9
C_{22}H_{28}O_{2}	norethisterone acetate	51-98-9
C_{22}H_{29}ClO_{5}	beclomethasone	4419-39-0
C_{22}H_{29}NO_{2}	dextropropoxyphene	469-62-5
C_{22}H_{29}NO_{2}	levopropoxyphene	2338-37-6
C_{22}H_{29}NO_{2}	noracymethadol	1477-39-0
C_{22}H_{29}N_{3}S_{2}	thiethylperazine	1420-55-9
C_{22}H_{30}N_{2}	aprindine	37640-71-4
C_{22}H_{30}N_{4}O_{2}S_{2}	thioproperazine	316-81-4
C_{22}H_{30}N_{6}O_{4}S	sildenafil	139755-83-2
C_{22}H_{30}O_{4}	ilimaquinone	71678-03-0
C_{22}H_{32}N_{2}O_{5}	benzquinamide	63-12-7
C_{22}H_{32}O_{2}	synhexyl	117-51-1
C_{22}H_{32}O_{4}	Cyclohexyl isooctyl phthalate	71486-48-1
C_{22}H_{32}Br_{2}N_{4}O_{4}	distigmine	15876-67-2
C_{22}H_{34}O_{4}	Butyl decyl phthalate	89-19-0
C_{22}H_{34}O_{4}	Butyl isodecyl phthalate	89-18-9
C_{22}H_{36}O	Hexadecanophenone	6697-12-7
C_{22}H_{36}O_{2}Si	testosterone trimethylsilyl ether	5055-42-5
C_{22}H_{37}F_{7}O_{2}	Octadecyl heptafluorobutanoate	400-57-7
C_{22}H_{39}O_{3}P	Dioctyl phenylphosphonate	1754-47-8
C_{22}H_{39}O_{4}P	Dioctyl phenyl phosphate	6161-81-5
C_{22}H_{40}BrNO	domiphen bromide	538-71-6
C_{22}H_{42}O_{2}	erucic acid	112-86-7
C_{22}H_{42}O_{4}	diisooctyl adipate	1330-86-5
C_{22}H_{42}O_{4}	Monostearyl succinate	2944-11-8
C_{22}H_{42}O_{5}	Diethylene glycol dipelargonate	106-01-4
C_{22}H_{42}O_{6}	Triethylene glycol dioctanoate	106-10-5
C_{22}H_{43}N	Docosanenitrile	49562-27-8
C_{22}H_{43}NO_{3}	Oleic diethanolamide	93-83-4
C_{22}H_{44}	Cyclododecane	296-86-6
C_{22}H_{44}N_{2}NiS_{4}	Nickel dipentyldithiocarbamate	36259-37-7
C_{22}H_{44}O_{2}	behenic acid	112-85-6
C_{22}H_{44}O_{2}	Ethyl eicosanoate	18281-05-5
C_{22}H_{44}O_{2}	Octadecyl butanoate	13373-83-6
C_{22}H_{46}S	Diundecyl sulfide	35599-82-7
C_{22}H_{51}NO_{3}Si_{3}	Threonine tritbdms	107715-94-6
C_{22}H_{66}O_{11}Si_{11}	Docosamethylcycloundecasiloxane	18766-38-6

== See also ==
- Carbon number
- List of compounds with carbon number 21
- List of compounds with carbon number 23
