= Naproanilide =

Weed control herbicide

Names
- IUPAC name (2RS)-2-(2-naphthyloxy)propananilide
- Preferred IUPAC name rac-2-(naphthalen-2-yloxy)-N-phenylpropanamide
- Other names: (RS)-2-(2-naphthyloxy)propionanilide; 2-(2 -naphthy1oxy)propionanilide

Identifiers
CAS Number	52570-16-8
3D model (JSmol)	Interactive image
ChEBI	CHEBI:7475
ChemSpider	36918
ECHA InfoCard	100.108.762
EC Number	610-862-5
KEGG	C10954
PubChem CID	40413
CompTox Dashboard (EPA)	DTXSID8058118
- InChI: InChI=1S/C19H17NO2/c1-14(19(21)20-17-9-3-2-4-10-17)22-18-12-11-15-7-5-6-8-16(15)13-18/h2-14H,1H3,(H,20,21) Key: LVKTWOXHRYGDMM-UHFFFAOYSA-N
- SMILES: CC(C(=O)NC1=CC=CC=C1)OC2=CC3=CC=CC=C3C=C2

Properties
Chemical formula	C_{19}H_{17}NO_{2}
Molar mass	291.350 g·mol^{−1}
- Except where otherwise noted, data are given for materials in their standard state (at 25 °C [77 °F], 100 kPa). Infobox references

Naproanilide is a selective acetamide herbicide, used on rice paddies to control dicotyl weeds, and many annual or perennial weeds. It was introduced in the 1970s.

Its normal application rate is 1-2 kg/Ha. It is extremely safe on rice, producing little effect even at 32 kg/Ha.

One metabolic product of naproanilide is naphthoxypropionic acid (NPA).
