= List of compounds with carbon number 14 =

This is a partial list of molecules that contain 14 carbon atoms.

Chemical formula	Synonyms	CAS number
C_{14}F_{24}	perfluorophenanthrene	306-91-2
C_{14}F_{30}	perfluorotetradecane	307-62-0
C_{14}H_{6}O_{8}	ellagic acid	476-66-4
C_{14}H_{8}N_{2}S_{4}	benzothiazyl disulfide	120-78-5
C_{14}H_{8}O_{4}	alizarin	72-48-0
C_{14}H_{8}O_{4}	anthraflavic acid	84-60-6
C_{14}H_{9}BrN_{2}O_{4}	c.i. disperse blue 56	12217-79-7
C_{14}H_{9}Cl_{5}	DDT	50-29-3
C_{14}H_{9}ClF_{2}N_{2}O_{2}	difluron	35367-38-5
C_{14}H_{9}F_{17}O_{2}	perfluorooctylethylene methacrylate	1996-88-9
C_{14}H_{9}NO_{2}	bentranil	1022-46-4
C_{14}H_{10}	anthracene	120-12-7
C_{14}H_{10}	diphenylethyne	501-65-5
C_{14}H_{10}	phenanthrene	85-01-8
C_{14}H_{10}BrN_{3}O	bromazepam	1812-30-2
C_{14}H_{10}Cl_{4}	mitotane	53-19-0
C_{14}H_{10}F_{3}NO_{2}	flufenamic acid	530-78-9
C_{14}H_{10}O	anthrone	90-44-8
C_{14}H_{10}O_{2}	anthracene transannular peroxide	220-42-8
C_{14}H_{10}O_{4}	benzoyl peroxide	94-36-0
C_{14}H_{10}O_{4}	oxalic acid diphenyl ester	3155-16-6
C_{14}H_{10}O_{5}	benzoylcarboxyperoxide phenyl ester	962-16-3
C_{14}H_{11}ClO	diphenylacetyl chloride	1871-76-7
C_{14}H_{11}Cl_{2}NO_{2}	diclofenac	15307-86-5
C_{14}H_{11}Cl_{2}NO_{2}	meclofenamic acid	644-62-2
C_{14}H_{11}F_{5}OSi	pentafluorophenyldimethylsilyloxybenzene	71338-91-5
C_{14}H_{11}NS	benzhydryl isothiocyanate	3550-21-8
C_{14}H_{12}	octalene	257-55-6
C_{14}H_{12}F_{3}NO_{4}S_{2}	perfluidone	37924-13-3
C_{14}H_{12}N_{2}	dibenzylideneazine	588-68-1
C_{14}H_{12}N_{2}O	benzil monohydrazone	5344-88-7
C_{14}H_{12}N_{2}O_{2}	salicylalazine	959-36-4
C_{14}H_{12}N_{2}O_{2}S	zolimidine	1222-57-7
C_{14}H_{12}O_{2}	benzoin	579-44-2
C_{14}H_{12}O_{2}	benzyl benzoate	120-51-4
C_{14}H_{12}O_{3}	oxybenzone	131-57-7
C_{14}H_{12}O_{3}	resveratrol	501-36-0
C_{14}H_{12}O_{3}	trioxsalen	3902-71-4
C_{14}H_{12}O_{4}	dioxybenzone	131-53-3
C_{14}H_{13}ClN_{6}O_{5}S	imazosulfuron	122548-33-8
C_{14}H_{13}ClSi	vinyldiphenylchlorosilane	18419-53-9
C_{14}H_{14}	bibenzyl	103-29-7
C_{14}H_{14}ClNS	ticlopidine	55142-85-3
C_{14}H_{14}Cl_{2}N_{2}O	imazalil	35554-44-0
C_{14}H_{14}Hg	dibenzylmercury	780-24-5
C_{14}H_{14}N_{2}	acetophenone phenylhydrazone	583-11-9
C_{14}H_{14}N_{2}	naphazoline	835-31-4
C_{14}H_{14}N_{2}O	dibenzyl nitrosamine	5336-53-8
C_{14}H_{14}N_{2}O	metyrapone	54-36-4
C_{14}H_{14}N_{4}	glyoxalphenylosazone	29841-71-2
C_{14}H_{14}O_{2}	hydrobenzoin	27134-24-3
C_{14}H_{14}O_{2}S	benzyl sulfone	620-32-6
C_{14}H_{14}O_{3}	naproxen	22204-53-1
C_{14}H_{14}O_{3}	pindone	83-26-1
C_{14}H_{14}O_{4}	diallyl isophthalate	1087-21-4
C_{14}H_{14}O_{8}	diethyl pyromellitate	50853-29-7
C_{14}H_{14}S_{2}	benzyl disulfide	150-60-7
C_{14}H_{14}Se	dibenzyl monoselenide	1842-38-2
C_{14}H_{15}Cl_{2}N	chlornaphazine	494-03-1
C_{14}H_{15}N	cyclohexylidenephenylacetonitrile	10461-98-0
C_{14}H_{15}N	dibenzylamine	103-49-1
C_{14}H_{15}OP	ethyldiphenylphosphine oxide	1733-57-9
C_{14}H_{15}O_{2}P	methoxymethyldiphenylphosphine oxide	4455-77-0
C_{14}H_{15}O_{2}PS_{2}	edifenphos	17109-49-8
C_{14}H_{15}O_{3}P	dibenzyl phosphite	17176-77-1
C_{14}H_{16}	chamazulene	529-05-5
C_{14}H_{16}	eudalene	490-65-3
C_{14}H_{16}ClN_{3}O_{4}S_{2}	cyclothiazide	2259-96-3
C_{14}H_{16}ClO_{5}PS	coumaphos	56-72-4
C_{14}H_{16}F_{3}N_{3}O_{4}	profluralin	26399-36-0
C_{14}H_{16}F_{3}N_{3}O_{4}	methalpropalin	57801-46-4
C_{14}H_{16}N_{2}O_{2}	etomidate	33125-97-2
C_{14}H_{16}O_{6}	ethylphthalyl ethyl glycolate	84-72-0
C_{14}H_{16}O_{8}	1,3,5,7-adamantanetetracarboxylic acid	100884-80-8
C_{14}H_{16}Si	dimethyl diphenylsilane	778-24-5
C_{14}H_{17}ClNO_{4}PS_{2}	dialifor	10311-84-9
C_{14}H_{17}F_{5}OSi	cyclohexanol dmpfps	71338-76-6
C_{14}H_{17}MnO_{2}	cycloheptenecyclopentadienylmanganese dicarbonyl	12131-30-5
C_{14}H_{17}N	cyclohexylphenylacetonitrile	3893-23-0
C_{14}H_{17}NS_{2}	dimethylthiambutene	524-84-5
C_{14}H_{18}ClN_{3}O_{2}	triadimenol	5519-65-3
C_{14}H_{18}ClN_{3}S	chloropyrilene	148-65-2
C_{14}H_{18}N_{2}O	propyphenazone	479-92-5
C_{14}H_{18}N_{2}O_{3}	reposal	3625-25-0
C_{14}H_{18}N_{4}O_{3}	trimethoprim	738-70-5
C_{14}H_{18}O	diamantanone	30545-23-4
C_{14}H_{18}O_{2}	amyl cinnamate	3487-99-8
C_{14}H_{18}O_{2}	cyclohexylphenylacetic acid	3894-09-5
C_{14}H_{18}O_{2}	isopentyl cinnamate	7779-65-9
C_{14}H_{18}O_{4}	diisopropyl phthalate	605-45-8
C_{14}H_{18}O_{4}	dipropyl isophthalate	3143-06-4
C_{14}H_{18}O_{4}	propyl benzyl succinate	119450-12-3
C_{14}H_{19}Cl_{2}NO_{2}	chlorambucil	305-03-3
C_{14}H_{19}Cl_{3}NO_{2}PS	trichlorophenyl cyclohexylamido ethyl thiophosphate	116295-49-9
C_{14}H_{19}NO_{2}	methylphenidate	113-45-1
C_{14}H_{19}NO_{2}	piperoxan	59-39-2
C_{14}H_{19}NO_{4}S	trithiozine	35619-65-9
C_{14}H_{19}NO_{5}	trimetozine	635-41-6
C_{14}H_{19}N_{3}S	methapyrilene	91-80-5
C_{14}H_{19}N_{3}S	thenyldiamine	91-79-2
C_{14}H_{19}O_{6}P	crotoxyphos	7700-17-6
C_{14}H_{20}	diadamantane	2292-79-7
C_{14}H_{20}Br_{2}N_{2}	bromhexine	3572-43-8
C_{14}H_{20}ClNO_{2}	acetochlor	34256-82-1
C_{14}H_{20}ClNO_{2}	alachlor	15972-60-8
C_{14}H_{20}N_{2}	diethyltryptamine	61-51-8
C_{14}H_{20}N_{2}O	pyrrocaine	2210-77-7
C_{14}H_{20}N_{2}O_{2}	pindolol	13523-86-9
C_{14}H_{20}N_{3}O_{5}PS	pyrazophos	13457-18-6
C_{14}H_{20}N_{4}O	imolamine	318-23-0
C_{14}H_{20}O	lilial	80-54-6
C_{14}H_{20}O_{2}	dimethylbenzylcarbinyl butyrate	10094-34-5
C_{14}H_{20}O_{8}	tetraethyl ethylenetetracarboxylate	6174-95-4
C_{14}H_{21}F_{7}O_{2}	decyl heptafluorobutanoate	2994-16-3
C_{14}H_{21}NO	profadol	428-37-5
C_{14}H_{21}NO	zylofuramine	3563-92-6
C_{14}H_{21}NO_{2}	amylocaine	644-26-8
C_{14}H_{21}NO_{2}	padimate	14779-78-3
C_{14}H_{21}NOS	prosulfocarb	52888-80-9
C_{14}H_{21}N_{3}O_{2}S	sumatriptan	103628-46-2
C_{14}H_{21}N_{3}O_{4}	butralin	33629-47-9
C_{14}H_{21}O_{8}PW	tungsten triisopropylphosphite pentacarbonyl	23306-45-8
C_{14}H_{22}BrN_{3}O_{2}	bromopride	4093-35-0
C_{14}H_{22}ClNO	clobutinol	14860-49-2
C_{14}H_{22}N_{2}O	angustifoline	550-43-6
C_{14}H_{22}N_{2}O	lidocaine	137-58-6
C_{14}H_{22}N_{2}O	octacaine	13912-77-1
C_{14}H_{22}O_{6}	peroxydicarbonic acid dicyclohexyl ester	1561-49-5
C_{14}H_{23}N_{7}O_{8}	heptaglycine	18861-82-0
C_{14}H_{23}O_{4}P	dibutyl phenyl phosphate	2528-36-1
C_{14}H_{24}	perhydrophenanthrene	5743-97-5
C_{14}H_{24}NO_{4}PS_{3}	bensulide	741-58-2
C_{14}H_{24}O_{2}	allyl undecylenate	7493-76-7
C_{14}H_{24}O_{2}	bornyl butyrate	13109-70-1
C_{14}H_{24}O_{2}	bornyl isobutyrate	50277-27-5
C_{14}H_{24}O_{2}	geranyl isobutyrate	2345-26-8
C_{14}H_{24}O_{2}	linalol isobutyrate	78-35-3
C_{14}H_{24}O_{2}	linalyl butyrate	78-36-4
C_{14}H_{24}O_{4}	diamyl maleate	10099-71-5
C_{14}H_{25}Cl_{3}O_{2}	dodecyl trichloroacetate	74339-50-7
C_{14}H_{26}Cl_{2}O_{2}	dodecyl dichloroacetate	83005-01-0
C_{14}H_{26}O	acetylcyclododecane	28925-00-0
C_{14}H_{26}O_{2}	citronellyl butyrate	141-16-2
C_{14}H_{26}O_{2}	citronellyl isobutyrate	97-89-2
C_{14}H_{26}O_{2}	decyl methacrylate	3179-47-3
C_{14}H_{26}O_{4}	diamyl succinate	645-69-2
C_{14}H_{27}BrO_{2}	dodecyl bromoacetate	3674-07-5
C_{14}H_{27}ClO	myristoyl chloride	112-64-1
C_{14}H_{27}ClO_{2}	dodecyl chloroacetate	6316-04-7
C_{14}H_{27}N	ethyldicyclohexylamine	7175-49-7
C_{14}H_{27}N	tetradecanenitrile	629-63-0
C_{14}H_{27}O_{2}Tl	thallium tetradecanoate	18993-53-8
C_{14}H_{28}	cyclotetradecane	295-17-0
C_{14}H_{28}NO_{3}PS_{2}	piperophos	24151-93-7
C_{14}H_{28}N_{2}NiS_{4}	nickel dipropyldithiocarbamate	14516-30-4
C_{14}H_{28}O	tetradecanal	124-25-4
C_{14}H_{28}O	vinyl lauryl ether	765-14-0
C_{14}H_{28}O_{2}	butyl caprate	30673-36-0
C_{14}H_{28}O_{2}	methyl tridecanoate ester	1731-88-0
C_{14}H_{28}O_{2}	tetradecanoic acid	544-63-8
C_{14}H_{28}O_{3}	tetradecaneperoxoic acid	19816-73-0
C_{14}H_{28}O_{7}	21-crown-7	251-373-3
C_{14}H_{29}F	tetradecyl fluoride	73180-09-3
C_{14}H_{29}NO	tetradecanamide	638-58-4
C_{14}H_{30}	tetradecane	629-59-4
C_{14}H_{30}O	hexyl octyl ether	17071-54-4
C_{14}H_{30}O	tetradecanol	27196-00-5
C_{14}H_{30}O_{2}Sn	tributyl tin acetate	56-36-0
C_{14}H_{30}O_{7}	hexaethylene glycol dimethyl ether	1072-40-8
C_{14}H_{30}O_{8}	heptaethylene glycol	5617-32-3
C_{14}H_{31}N	diheptylamine	2470-68-0
C_{14}H_{31}PO_{3}	tetradecylphosphonic acid	4671-75-4
C_{14}H_{31}O_{3}P	diethyl decylphosphonate	16165-68-7
C_{14}H_{32}OSi	ethoxytributylsilane	4782-00-7
C_{14}H_{32}O_{3}Si	tributyloxyethylsilane	17957-38-9
C_{14}H_{32}SiO_{3}	octyltriethoxysilane	2943-75-1
C_{14}H_{33}NO_{2}Si_{2}	glycine ditbdms	107715-88-8
C_{14}H_{36}Si_{3}	di-tert-butyl hexamethyltrisilane	6624-41-5
C_{14}H_{40}N_{6}Si_{2}	Trisdimethylaminosilyl ethane	20248-45-7
C_{14}H_{42}Si_{7}	tetradecamethylcycloheptasilane	13452-94-3
C_{14}H_{42}Si_{6}O_{5}	tetradecamethylhexasiloxane	107-52-8
C_{14}H_{42}Si_{7}O_{7}	tetradecamethylcycloheptasiloxane	107-50-6

== See also ==
- Carbon number
- List of compounds with carbon number 13
- List of compounds with carbon number 15
