= Cyclohexanethiol =

Names
- Preferred IUPAC name Cyclohexanethiol

Identifiers
CAS Number	1569-69-3
3D model (JSmol)	Interactive image
ChemSpider	14555
ECHA InfoCard	100.014.890
PubChem CID	15290
UNII	N8HOD9900V
CompTox Dashboard (EPA)	DTXSID2027416
- InChI: InChI=1S/C6H12S/c7-6-4-2-1-3-5-6/h6-7H,1-5H2 Key: CMKBCTPCXZNQKX-UHFFFAOYSA-N; InChI=1/C6H12S/c7-6-4-2-1-3-5-6/h6-7H,1-5H2 Key: CMKBCTPCXZNQKX-UHFFFAOYAW
- SMILES: C1CCC(CC1)S

Properties
Chemical formula	C_{6}H_{12}S
Molar mass	116.22 g·mol^{−1}
Appearance	Colorless liquid
Density	0.95 g/cm^{3}
Boiling point	158 to 160 °C (316 to 320 °F; 431 to 433 K)
Solubility in water	Low
- Except where otherwise noted, data are given for materials in their standard state (at 25 °C [77 °F], 100 kPa). Infobox references

Cyclohexanethiol is a thiol with the formula C_{6}H_{11}SH. It is a colorless liquid with a strong odor.

== Preparation ==
It was first prepared by the free-radical reaction of cyclohexane using carbon disulfide as a sulfur source.

It is produced industrially by the hydrogenation of cyclohexanone in the presence of hydrogen sulfide over a metal sulfide catalyst:

C_{6}H_{10}O + H_{2}S + H_{2} → C_{6}H_{11}SH + H_{2}O

It is also obtained by the addition of hydrogen sulfide to cyclohexene in the presence of nickel sulfide.

== Safety ==
The LD_{50} (injected, mice) was estimated at 316 mg/kg by the United States Department of Health, Education, and Welfare.
