= List of compounds with carbon number 18 =

This is a partial list of molecules that contain 18 carbon atoms.

| Chemical formula | Synonyms | CAS number |
|---|---|---|
| C_{18}F_{39}N | perfluorotrihexylamine | 432-08-6 |
| C_{18}H_{8}S_{4} | tetrathianaphthacene | 193-44-2 |
| C_{18}H_{10}Cl_{2}O_{2}S_{2} | c.i. vat red 1 | 2379-74-0 |
| C_{18}H_{10}Cl_{2}O_{2}S_{2} | c.i. vat violet 2 | 5462-29-3 |
| C_{18}H_{11}N_{3}O_{7} | acenaphthene picric acid | 4599-99-9 |
| C_{18}H_{12} | chrysene | 218-01-9 |
| C_{18}H_{12} | naphthacene | 92-24-0 |
| C_{18}H_{12} | triphenylene | 217-59-4 |
| C_{18}H_{12}NO_{3} | naptalam | 132-66-1 |
| C_{18}H_{13}ClN_{2}O | pinazepam | 52463-83-9 |
| C_{18}H_{13}O | pentaethylacetophenone | 500021-17-0 |
| C_{18}H_{14} | dihydrochrysene | 41593-31-1 |
| C_{18}H_{14} | terphenyl | 26140-60-3 |
| C_{18}H_{14}ClFN_{2}O_{3} | ethyl loflazepate | 29177-84-2 |
| C_{18}H_{14}Cl_{4}N_{2}O | miconazole | 22916-47-8 |
| C_{18}H_{14}O_{4} | dicinnamoyl peroxide | 15036-31-4 |
| C_{18}H_{15}BrCoN_{2}O_{2}P | triphenylphosphinecobalt dinitrosyl bromide | 14318-88-8 |
| C_{18}H_{15}BrFeN_{2}O_{2}P | triphenylphosphineiron dinitrosyl bromide | 38831-62-8 |
| C_{18}H_{15}BrGe | triphenylgermanium bromide | 3005-32-1 |
| C_{18}H_{15}ClSi | triphenylchlorosilane | 76-86-8 |
| C_{18}H_{15}ClSn | chlorotriphenyl tin | 639-58-7 |
| C_{18}H_{15}CoIN_{2}O_{2}P | triphenylphosphinecobalt dinitrosyl iodide | 14318-98-0 |
| C_{18}H_{15}FSi | fluorotriphenylsilane | 379-50-0 |
| C_{18}H_{15}FeIN_{2}O_{2}P | triphenylphosphineiron dinitrosyl iodide | 14588-79-5 |
| C_{18}H_{15}ISn | triphenyltin iodide | 894-09-7 |
| C_{18}H_{15}OP | phenyl diphenylphosphinite | 13360-92-4 |
| C_{18}H_{15}O_{3}P | phenyl phosphonic acid diphenyl ester | 3049-24-9 |
| C_{18}H_{15}O_{4}P | triphenylphosphate | 115-86-6 |
| C_{18}H_{15}PSe | triphenylphosphine selenide | 3878-44-2 |
| C_{18}H_{16}Cr | benzenebiphenylchromium | 12095-46-4 |
| C_{18}H_{16}O_{2} | cinnamyl cinnamate | 122-69-0 |
| C_{18}H_{16}O_{2} | retenequinone | 5398-75-4 |
| C_{18}H_{16}O_{2}Si | dianisyldiethynylsilane | 55986-09-9 |
| C_{18}H_{16}O_{3} | phenprocoumon | 435-97-2 |
| C_{18}H_{16}O_{4} | dibenzyl maleate | 62-26-0 |
| C_{18}H_{16}O_{7} | Several molecules | – |
| C_{18}H_{16}Sn | triphenyltin hydride | 892-20-6 |
| C_{18}H_{17}ClN_{2}O_{2} | oxazolam | 24143-17-7 |
| C_{18}H_{17}Cl_{2}NO_{3} | benzoylprop ethyl | 22212-55-1 |
| C_{18}H_{17}NSi | triphenylsilanamine | 4215-80-9 |
| C_{18}H_{17}O_{7} | Several molecules | – |
| C_{18}H_{18}BrClN_{2}O | metaclazepam | 65517-27-3 |
| C_{18}H_{18}ClNS | chlorprothixene | 113-59-7 |
| C_{18}H_{18}ClN_{2}O_{2}P | fosazepam | 35322-07-7 |
| C_{18}H_{18}ClN_{3}O | loxapine | 1977-10-2 |
| C_{18}H_{18}ClN_{3}S | clothiapine | 2058-52-8 |
| C_{18}H_{18}N_{2}O_{2} | phenylalanylanhydride | 2308-61-4 |
| C_{18}H_{18}N_{2}O_{5} | ethyl azoxybenzenedicarboxylate | 6421-04-1 |
| C_{18}H_{18}O_{2} | dienestrol | 84-17-3 |
| C_{18}H_{18}O_{2} | equilenin acetate | 517-09-9 |
| C_{18}H_{18}O_{4} | diphenyl adipate | 3195-37-7 |
| C_{18}H_{19}ClN_{4} | clozapine | 5786-21-0 |
| C_{18}H_{19}F_{3}N_{2}S | triflupromazine | 146-54-3 |
| C_{18}H_{19}N | benzoctamine | 17243-39-9 |
| C_{18}H_{19}NO | nordoxepin | 1225-56-5 |
| C_{18}H_{19}NOS | duloxetine | 116539-59-4 |
| C_{18}H_{19}NO_{5} | melicopicine | 517-73-7 |
| C_{18}H_{20}Cl_{2} | perthane | 72-56-0 |
| C_{18}H_{20}N_{2}S | methdilazine | 1982-37-2 |
| C_{18}H_{20}N_{2}S | pyrathiazine | 84-08-2 |
| C_{18}H_{20}O_{2} | diethylstilbestrol | 56-53-1 |
| C_{18}H_{21}ClN_{2} | chlorcyclizine | 82-93-9 |
| C_{18}H_{21}NO | azacyclonol | 115-46-8 |
| C_{18}H_{21}NO_{2} | methyldesorphine | 16008-36-9 |
| C_{18}H_{21}NO_{3} | codeine | 76-57-3 |
| C_{18}H_{21}NO_{3} | hydrocodone | 125-29-1 |
| C_{18}H_{21}NO_{3} | neopine | 467-14-1 |
| C_{18}H_{21}NO_{4} | oxycodone | 76-42-6 |
| C_{18}H_{21}N_{3}O | dibenzepin | 4498-32-2 |
| C_{18}H_{21}OP | diphenylcyclohexylphosphine oxide | 13689-20-8 |
| C_{18}H_{22}BrNO | embramine | 3565-72-8 |
| C_{18}H_{22}ClNO | chlorphenoxamine | 77-38-3 |
| C_{18}H_{22}ClNO | phenoxybenzamine | 59-96-1 |
| C_{18}H_{22}N_{2} | cyclizine | 82-92-8 |
| C_{18}H_{22}N_{2} | desipramine | 50-47-5 |
| C_{18}H_{22}N_{2}OS | methoxypromazine | 61-01-8 |
| C_{18}H_{22}N_{2}O_{2}S | oxomemazine | 3689-50-7 |
| C_{18}H_{22}N_{2}S | diethazine | 60-91-3 |
| C_{18}H_{22}N_{2}S | trimeprazine | 84-96-8 |
| C_{18}H_{22}O_{2} | hexoestrol | 84-16-2 |
| C_{18}H_{22}O_{5} | zearalenone | 18695-28-8 |
| C_{18}H_{22}O_{8} | tetraethylpyromellitate | 6634-01-1 |
| C_{18}H_{23}N | tolpropamide | 5632-44-0 |
| C_{18}H_{23}NO | orphenadrine | 83-98-7 |
| C_{18}H_{23}NO_{3} | dihydrocodeine | 125-28-0 |
| C_{18}H_{23}NO_{3} | isoxsuprine | 395-28-8 |
| C_{18}H_{23}NO_{3} | methyldihydromorphine | 509-56-8 |
| C_{18}H_{23}NO_{4} | ethylbenzoylecgonine | 529-38-4 |
| C_{18}H_{23}NO_{5} | seneciphylline | 480-81-9 |
| C_{18}H_{23}NO_{5} | spartioidine | 520-59-2 |
| C_{18}H_{23}NO_{6} | jacozine | 5532-23-0 |
| C_{18}H_{23}NO_{6} | riddelliine | 23246-96-0 |
| C_{18}H_{23}NO_{7} | senecicannabine | 81855-31-4 |
| C_{18}H_{23}N_{5}O_{2} | fenethylline | 1892-80-4 |
| C_{18}H_{24} | triamantane | 13349-10-5 |
| C_{18}H_{24} | estrin | 1217-09-0 |
| C_{18}H_{24}N_{2}O_{6} | dinocap | 39300-45-3 |
| C_{18}H_{24}O_{2} | geranyl phenylacetate | 102-22-7 |
| C_{18}H_{24}O_{3} | estriol | 50-27-1 |
| C_{18}H_{24}O_{6} | butylphthalyl butyl glycolate | 85-70-1 |
| C_{18}H_{25}NO | cyclazocine | 3572-80-3 |
| C_{18}H_{25}NO | dextromethorphan | 125-71-3 |
| C_{18}H_{25}NO | racemethorphan | 510-53-2 |
| C_{18}H_{25}NO_{2} | allylprodine | 25384-17-2 |
| C_{18}H_{25}NO_{5} | doronenine | 74217-57-5 |
| C_{18}H_{25}NO_{5} | integerrimine | 480-79-5 |
| C_{18}H_{25}NO_{5} | senecionine | 130-01-8 |
| C_{18}H_{25}NO_{5} | triangularine | 87340-27-0 |
| C_{18}H_{25}NO_{6} | retrorsine | 480-54-6 |
| C_{18}H_{25}NO_{6} | usaramine | 15503-87-4 |
| C_{18}H_{26}ClNO_{6} | jaconine | 480-75-1 |
| C_{18}H_{26}ClN_{3} | chloroquine | 54-05-7 |
| C_{18}H_{26}ClN_{3}O | hydroxychloroquine | 118-42-3 |
| C_{18}H_{26}O | versalide | 88-29-9 |
| C_{18}H_{26}O_{2} | cynmethylin | 87818-31-3 |
| C_{18}H_{26}O_{4} | dipentyl terephthalate | 1818-95-7 |
| C_{18}H_{26}O_{4} | heptyl benzyl succinate | 119450-15-6 |
| C_{18}H_{26}O_{12} | hexaacetylmannitol | 5346-76-9 |
| C_{18}H_{27}NO_{2} | caramiphen | 77-22-5 |
| C_{18}H_{27}NO_{4} | etoxeridine | 469-82-9 |
| C_{18}H_{27}NO_{5} | platyphylline | 480-78-4 |
| C_{18}H_{27}NO_{5} | propanidid | 1421-14-3 |
| C_{18}H_{27}NO_{6} | rosmarinine | 520-65-0 |
| C_{18}H_{27}NO_{7} | jacoline | 480-76-2 |
| C_{18}H_{27}NO_{7} | sceleratine | 6190-25-6 |
| C_{18}H_{27}N_{3}O | pentaquin | 86-78-2 |
| C_{18}H_{27}P | dicyclohexylphenylphosphine | 6476-37-5 |
| C_{18}H_{28} | cyclododecylbenzene | 15971-88-7 |
| C_{18}H_{28}N_{2}O_{4} | acebutolol | 37517-30-9 |
| C_{18}H_{28}N_{2}O_{3}S | almokalant | 123955-10-2 |
| C_{18}H_{28}N_{4}O | butalamine | 22131-35-7 |
| C_{18}H_{28}O | dodecanophenone | 1674-38-0 |
| C_{18}H_{29}NO_{2} | ketocaine | 1092-46-2 |
| C_{18}H_{29}NO_{3} | amprotropine | 148-32-3 |
| C_{18}H_{29}NO_{4} | guaiapate | 852-42-6 |
| C_{18}H_{30} | perhydrochrysene | 2090-14-4 |
| C_{18}H_{30}BaCa_{2}O_{12} | barium dicalcium propionate | 17115-98-9 |
| C_{18}H_{30}Ca_{2}O_{12}Pb | lead dicalcium propionate | 17203-66-6 |
| C_{18}H_{30}Ca_{2}O_{12}Sr | strontium dicalcium propionate | 54993-39-4 |
| C_{18}H_{30} | estrane | |
| C_{18}H_{30}O | farnesyl acetone | 1117-52-8 |
| C_{18}H_{30}O | linolenyl aldehyde | 2423-13-4 |
| C_{18}H_{30}O_{2} | alpha-linolenic acid | 463-40-1 |
| C_{18}H_{30}O_{2} | gamma-linolenic acid | 506-26-3 |
| C_{18}H_{30}O_{4} | dicyclohexyl adipate | 849-99-0 |
| C_{18}H_{32}O | linoleyl aldehyde | 2541-61-9 |
| C_{18}H_{32}O_{2} | linoleic acid | 60-33-3 |
| C_{18}H_{32}O_{2} | linoelaidic acid | 506-21-8 |
| C_{18}H_{32}O_{2} | stearolic acid | 506-24-1 |
| C_{18}H_{32}O_{2}S | triprene | 40596-80-3 |
| C_{18}H_{32}O_{7} | butyl citrate | 77-94-1 |
| C_{18}H_{33}Cl_{3}O_{2} | hexadecyl trichloroacetate | 74339-54-1 |
| C_{18}H_{33}NO | linoleamide | 3999-01-7 |
| C_{18}H_{34}N_{2}O_{6}S | lincomycin | 154-21-2 |
| C_{18}H_{34}O | cyclooctadecanone | 6907-37-5 |
| C_{18}H_{34}O_{2} | oleic acid | 2027-47-6 |
| C_{18}H_{34}O_{3} | castor oil | 8001-79-4 |
| C_{18}H_{34}O_{3} | ricinoleic acid | 141-22-0 |
| C_{18}H_{34}O_{4} | octadecanedioic acid | 871-70-5 |
| C_{18}H_{35}BrO_{2} | hexadecyl bromoacetate | 5454-48-8 |
| C_{18}H_{35}ClO | stearic acid chloride | 112-76-5 |
| C_{18}H_{35}ClO_{2} | hexadecyl chloroacetate | 52132-58-8 |
| C_{18}H_{35}N | octadecanenitrile | 638-65-3 |
| C_{18}H_{35}NO | elaidamide | 4303-70-2 |
| C_{18}H_{35}O_{2}Tl | thallium octadecanoate | 33734-56-4 |
| C_{18}H_{36} | cyclooctadecane | 296-18-4 |
| C_{18}H_{36} | dodecylcyclohexane | 1795-17-1 |
| C_{18}H_{36} | hexaethylcyclohexane | 98803-61-3 |
| C_{18}H_{36}N_{2}NiS_{4} | nickel diisobutyldithiocarbamate | 15317-78-9 |
| C_{18}H_{36}O | oleyl alcohol | 143-28-2 |
| C_{18}H_{36}O | stearaldehyde | 638-66-4 |
| C_{18}H_{36}O_{2} | hexyl dodecanoate | 34316-64-8 |
| C_{18}H_{36}O_{2} | octadecanoic acid | 57-11-4 |
| C_{18}H_{36}O_{3} | octadecaneperoxoic acid | 5796-86-1 |
| C_{18}H_{37}NO | octadecanamide | 124-26-5 |
| C_{18}H_{37}NO_{5} | sarracine | 2492-09-3 |
| C_{18}H_{38} | octadecane | 593-45-3 |
| C_{18}H_{38}N_{2}O | stearic acid hydrazide | 4130-54-5 |
| C_{18}H_{38}O_{4}Si_{2} | dodecanedioic acid di tms | 22396-19-6 |
| C_{18}H_{38}O_{7} | hexapropylene glycol | 52794-80-6 |
| C_{18}H_{38}S | dinonyl sulfide | 929-98-6 |
| C_{18}H_{39}BrSi | bromotrihexylsilane | 11643-50-8 |
| C_{18}H_{39}N | dinonylamine | 2044-21-5 |
| C_{18}H_{39}O_{3}P | trihexyl phosphite | 6095-42-7 |
| C_{18}H_{41}NO_{2}Si_{2} | leucine ditbdms | 92771-65-8 |
| C_{18}H_{54}Si_{8} | octadecamethyloctasilane | 3704-48-1 |

== See also ==
- Carbon number
- List of compounds with carbon number 17
- List of compounds with carbon number 19
