= List of compounds with carbon number 24 =

This is a partial list of molecules that contain 24 carbon atoms.

Chemical formula	Synonyms	CAS number
C_{24}H_{12}	coronene	191-07-1
C_{24}H_{20}AsCl	tetraphenylarsonium chloride	507-28-8
C_{24}H_{20}ClP	tetraphenylphosphonium chloride	2001-45-8
C_{24}H_{24}N_{2}O_{4}	nicocodine	3688-66-2
C_{24}H_{25}NO_{3}	benzylmorphine	14297-87-1
C_{24}H_{25}NO_{4}	flavoxate	15301-69-6
C_{24}H_{26}N_{2}O_{4}	nicodicodine	808-24-2
C_{24}H_{27}N	prenylamine	390-64-7
C_{24}H_{27}NO_{2}	levophenacylmorphan	10061-32-2
C_{24}H_{29}NO	phenomorphan	468-07-5
C_{24}H_{31}FO_{5}	triamcinolone acetonide	76-25-5
C_{24}H_{31}NO	dipipanone	467-83-4
C_{24}H_{31}N_{3}O	famprofazone	22881-35-2
C_{24}H_{31}N_{3}OS	butaperazine	653-03-2
C_{24}H_{31}N_{3}O_{2}S	carphenazine	2622-30-2
C_{24}H_{32}O_{4}	estradiol dipropionate	309267-99-0
C_{24}H_{32}O_{4}	etynodiol acetate	297-76-7
C_{24}H_{32}O_{4}	megestrol acetate	595-33-5
C_{24}H_{32}O_{4}S	spironolactone	52-01-7
C_{24}H_{33}NO_{3}	nafronyl	31329-57-4
C_{24}H_{34}O_{5}	dehydrocholic acid	81-23-2
C_{24}H_{34}N_{2}O_{4}	hemicholinium-3	312-45-8
C_{24}H_{40}O_{3}	lithocholic acid	434-13-9
C_{24}H_{40}O_{5}	cholic acid	81-25-4
C_{24}H_{42}N_{2}	feclemine	3590-16-7
C_{24}H_{44}O_{6}	tween 80	1338-43-8
C_{24}H_{48}O_{2}	tetracosanoic acid	557-59-5

== See also ==
- Carbon number
- List of compounds with carbon number 23
- List of compounds with carbon numbers 25–29
