= List of compounds with carbon number 4 =

This is a partial list of molecules that contain 4 carbon atoms.

Chemical formula	Synonyms	CAS number
C_{4}Br_{2}	dibromobutadiyne	36333-41-2
C_{4}Ce	cerium tetracarbide	12151-79-0
C_{4}ClF_{7}O	heptafluorobutyryl chloride	375-16-6
C_{4}Cl_{2}F_{4}O_{2}	tetrafluorosuccinyl chloride	356-15-0
C_{4}Cl_{2}F_{4}O_{3}	chlorodifluoroacetic anhydride	2834-23-3
C_{4}Cl_{2}O_{4}Rh_{2}	dirhodium tetracarbonyl dichloride	14523-22-9
C_{4}Cl_{3}CoO_{4}Si	trichlorosilylcobalt tetracarbonyl	14239-21-5
C_{4}Cl_{4}O	perchlorocyclobutenone	3200-96-2
C_{4}CoF_{3}O_{4}Si	trifluorosilylcobalt tetracarbonyl	15693-79-5
C_{4}Dy	dysprosium tetracarbide	12543-88-3
C_{4}F_{4}O_{3}	tetrafluorosuccinic anhydride	699-30-9
C_{4}F_{6}O	hexafluorocyclobutanone	699-35-4
C_{4}F_{8}	octafluorocyclobutane	115-25-3
C_{4}F_{10}O_{2}S	nonafluorobutanesulfonyl fluoride	375-72-4
C_{4}FeI_{2}O_{4}	iron tetracarbonyl diiodide	14911-55-8
C_{4}FeO_{4}	iron tetracarbonyl	15281-98-8
C_{4}H_{2}Br_{2}O_{3}	mucobromic acid	488-11-9
C_{4}H_{2}Br_{2}O_{3}	mucobromic acid lactone	766-38-1
C_{4}H_{2}Cl_{2}O_{2}	fumaryl chloride	627-63-4
C_{4}H_{2}Cl_{2}O_{3}	mucochloric acid	87-56-9
C_{4}H_{2}Cl_{4}O_{3}	dichloroacetic anhydride	4124-30-5
C_{4}H_{2}F_{4}O_{4}	tetrafluorosuccinic acid	377-38-8
C_{4}H_{2}N_{2}	fumaronitrile	764-42-1
C_{4}H_{2}N_{2}O_{4}	alloxan	50-71-5
C_{4}H_{3}BrS	2-bromothiophene	1003-09-4
C_{4}H_{3}ClN_{2}	chloropyrazine	14508-49-7
C_{4}H_{3}Cl_{3}OS	methyl trichlorothioacrylate	76619-91-5
C_{4}H_{3}Cu	copper vinylacetylenide	5256-77-9
C_{4}H_{3}F_{3}O_{2}	vinyl trifluoroacetate	433-28-3
C_{4}H_{3}F_{5}O_{2}	pentafluoropropanoic acid methyl ester	378-75-6
C_{4}H_{3}F_{7}O	heptafluoropropyl methyl ether	375-03-1
C_{4}H_{3}F_{7}O	methyl perfluoroisopropyl ether	22052-84-2
C_{4}H_{3}F_{7}O	sevoflurane	28523-86-6
C_{4}H_{3}N	cyanoallene	1001-56-5
C_{4}H_{3}N_{3}O_{4}	violuric acid	87-39-8
C_{4}H_{4}	cyclobutadiene	1120-53-2
C_{4}H_{4}	methylenecyclopropene	4095-06-1
C_{4}H_{4}	Tetrahedrane	157-39-1
C_{4}H_{4}AsCl_{3}	lewisite 2	40334-69-8
C_{4}H_{4}Cl_{2}O_{2}	butanedioyl dichloride	543-20-4
C_{4}H_{4}Cl_{2}O_{2}	vinyl dichloro acetate	7561-04-8
C_{4}H_{4}N_{2}	pyrazine	290-37-9
C_{4}H_{4}N_{2}	pyridazine	289-80-5
C_{4}H_{4}N_{2}	succinonitrile	110-61-2
C_{4}H_{4}N_{2}O_{2}	acetylenedicarboxamide	543-21-5
C_{4}H_{4}N_{2}O_{2}	maleic hydrazide	123-33-1
C_{4}H_{4}N_{2}O_{2}	uracil	66-22-8
C_{4}H_{4}N_{2}O_{2}S	sulfonyl diacetonitrile	37463-94-8
C_{4}H_{4}N_{2}O_{3}	barbituric acid	67-52-7
C_{4}H_{4}N_{2}O_{3}	barbituric acid	32267-40-6
C_{4}H_{4}N_{2}O_{5}	alloxan	3237-50-1
C_{4}H_{4}N_{2}S_{2}	dithiouracil	2001-93-6
C_{4}H_{4}N_{2}S_{2}	ethylene dithiocyanate	629-17-4
C_{4}H_{4}Na_{2}O_{4}	sodium succinate	150-90-3
C_{4}H_{4}O	furan	110-00-9
C_{4}H_{4}O_{3}S	thiodiglycolic anhydride	3261-87-8
C_{4}H_{4}O_{4}	ethylene oxalate	3524-70-7
C_{4}H_{4}O_{4}	fumaric acid	110-17-8
C_{4}H_{4}O_{5}	oxalacetic acid	328-42-7
C_{4}H_{4}S	thiophene	110-02-1
C_{4}H_{4}S_{2}	2-thiophenethiol	7774-74-5
C_{4}H_{4}S_{2}	3-thiophenethiol	7774-73-4
C_{4}H_{4}Se	selenophene	288-05-1
C_{4}H_{4}Te	tellurophene	288-08-4
C_{4}H_{5}BrF_{2}O_{2}	ethyl bromodifluoroacetate	667-27-6
C_{4}H_{5}ClO	cyclopropanecarboxylic acid chloride	4023-34-1
C_{4}H_{5}ClO	methacryloyl chloride	920-46-7
C_{4}H_{5}ClO_{3}	methyl malonyl chloride	37517-81-0
C_{4}H_{5}F_{5}O	ethyl pentafluoroethyl ether	22052-81-9
C_{4}H_{5}N	allyl isocyanide	2835-21-4
C_{4}H_{5}N	cyclopropanecarbonitrile	5500-21-0
C_{4}H_{5}N	pyrrole	109-97-7
C_{4}H_{5}NO_{2}S	ethoxycarbonyl isothiocyanate	16182-04-0
C_{4}H_{5}NO_{3}	maleamic acid	557-24-4
C_{4}H_{5}NS	allyl isothiocyanate	57-06-7
C_{4}H_{5}N_{3}	aminopyrazine	5049-61-6
C_{4}H_{5}N_{3}O_{3}	uramil	118-78-5
C_{4}H_{6}	cyclobutene	822-35-5
C_{4}H_{6}	methylenecyclopropane	6142-73-0
C_{4}H_{6}Br_{2}O_{2}	ethyl dibromoacetate	617-33-4
C_{4}H_{6}MgO_{4}	magnesium acetate	142-72-3
C_{4}H_{6}N_{2}O_{2}	dihydrouracil	504-07-4
C_{4}H_{6}N_{2}O_{2}	dimethylfurazan monoxide	2518-42-5
C_{4}H_{6}N_{2}O_{2}	ethyl diazoacetate	623-73-4
C_{4}H_{6}N_{2}S	methimazole	60-56-0
C_{4}H_{6}N_{4}O_{2}	glycoluril	496-46-8
C_{4}H_{6}N_{4}O_{12}	erythrityl tetranitrate	142435-64-1
C_{4}H_{6}O	crotonaldehyde	123-73-9
C_{4}H_{6}O	cyclobutanone	1191-95-3
C_{4}H_{6}O	cyclopropanecarboxaldehyde	1489-69-6
C_{4}H_{6}O	ethoxyacetylene	927-80-0
C_{4}H_{6}O	ethylketene	20334-52-5
C_{4}H_{6}O	methyl propargyl ether	627-41-8
C_{4}H_{6}O	methyl vinyl ketone	78-94-4
C_{4}H_{6}O	vinyl ether	109-93-3
C_{4}H_{6}OS	vinyl sulfoxide	1115-15-7
C_{4}H_{6}O_{2}	acetic acid ethenyl ester	108-05-4
C_{4}H_{6}O_{2}	crotonic acid	107-93-7
C_{4}H_{6}O_{2}	crotonic acid	3724-65-0
C_{4}H_{6}O_{2}	cyclopropanecarboxylic acid	1759-53-1
C_{4}H_{6}O_{2}	isocrotonic acid	503-64-0
C_{4}H_{6}O_{2}S	diacetyl sulfide	3232-39-1
C_{4}H_{6}O_{2}S	divinyl sulfone	77-77-0
C_{4}H_{6}O_{3}	acetic anhydride	108-24-7
C_{4}H_{6}O_{3}	propylene carbonate	108-32-7
C_{4}H_{6}O_{4}	butanedioic acid	110-15-6
C_{4}H_{6}O_{4}	diacetyl peroxide	110-22-5
C_{4}H_{6}O_{4}	methylmalonic acid	516-05-2
C_{4}H_{6}O_{4}Zn	zinc acetate	557-34-6
C_{4}H_{6}O_{5}	diglycolic acid	110-99-6
C_{4}H_{6}O_{5}	hydroxybutanedioic acid	6915-15-7
C_{4}H_{6}O_{5}	methyltartronic acid	595-98-2
C_{4}H_{6}O_{6}	meso tartaric acid	147-73-9
C_{4}H_{6}O_{6}	tartaric acid	133-37-9
C_{4}H_{6}S	divinyl sulfide	627-51-0
C_{4}H_{6}S	2,3-dihydrothiophene	1120-59-8
C_{4}H_{6}S_{4}	dimethyl tetrathiooxalate	61485-47-0
C_{4}H_{7}	cyclobutyl radical	4548-06-5
C_{4}H_{7}AlO_{5}	aluminum diacetate	142-03-0
C_{4}H_{7}Br	cyclobutyl bromide	4399-47-7
C_{4}H_{7}BrO	isobutyryl bromide	2736-37-0
C_{4}H_{7}ClO	butanoyl chloride	141-75-3
C_{4}H_{7}ClO_{2}	ethoxyacetyl chloride	500025-15-0
C_{4}H_{7}ClO_{2}	ethyl chloroacetate	105-39-5
C_{4}H_{7}CsO_{2}	caesium butyrate	38869-25-9
C_{4}H_{7}FO_{2}	isopropyl fluoromethanoate	500023-95-0
C_{4}H_{7}F_{4}N	tetrafluorodiethylamine	462-89-5
C_{4}H_{7}IO_{2}	ethyl iodoacetate	623-48-3
C_{4}H_{7}KO_{2}	potassium butyrate	589-39-9
C_{4}H_{7}LiO_{2}	lithium butyrate	21303-03-7
C_{4}H_{7}N	butyronitrile	109-74-0
C_{4}H_{7}NO	cyclopropanecarboxamide	6228-73-5
C_{4}H_{7}NO	ethoxyacetonitrile	62957-60-2
C_{4}H_{7}NO	methacrylamide	79-39-0
C_{4}H_{7}NO_{2}	acetoacetamide	5977-14-0
C_{4}H_{7}NO_{3}	ethyl oxamate	617-36-7
C_{4}H_{7}NO_{4}	aspartic acid	56-84-8
C_{4}H_{7}NS	isopropyl isothiocyanate	2253-73-8
C_{4}H_{7}N_{3}O	creatinine	60-27-5
C_{4}H_{7}NaO_{2}	sodium butyrate	156-54-7
C_{4}H_{7}O_{2}Rb	rubidium butyrate	38869-23-7
C_{4}H_{7}O_{2}Tl	thallium butyrate	63424-49-7
C_{4}H_{8}	cyclobutane	287-23-0
C_{4}H_{8}	methylcyclopropane	594-11-6
C_{4}H_{8}Cl_{2}Si	ethylvinyldichlorosilane	10138-21-3
C_{4}H_{8}Cl_{3}O_{4}P	metrifonate	52-68-6
C_{4}H_{8}N_{2}	lysidine	534-26-9
C_{4}H_{8}N_{2}O_{2}	butanediamide	110-14-5
C_{4}H_{8}N_{2}O_{3}	ethyl allophanate	626-36-8
C_{4}H_{8}N_{2}O_{4}S_{2}	dithiodiglycolicdihydroxamic acid	764-29-4
C_{4}H_{8}N_{2}S	allylthiourea	109-57-9
C_{4}H_{8}O	butanal	123-72-8
C_{4}H_{8}O	cyclobutanol	2919-23-5
C_{4}H_{8}O	cyclopropyl carbinol	2516-33-8
C_{4}H_{8}O	cyclopropyl methyl ether	540-47-6
C_{4}H_{8}O_{2}	butyric acid	107-92-6
C_{4}H_{8}O_{2}	ethyl acetate	141-78-6
C_{4}H_{8}O_{2}	ethylene glycol monovinyl ether	764-48-7
C_{4}H_{8}O_{3}	ethylene glycol monoacetate	542-59-6
C_{4}H_{8}O_{4}	acetic acid dimer	6993-75-5
C_{4}H_{8}O_{4}	1,3,5,7-tetroxane	293-30-1
C_{4}H_{8}S	tetrahydrothiophene	110-01-0
C_{4}H_{8}S	ethylvinyl sulfide	627-50-9
C_{4}H_{8}S_{3}	allyl methyl trisulfide	34135-85-8
C_{4}H_{9}	isobutyl radical	4630-45-9
C_{4}H_{9}ClHg	isobutylmercuric chloride	27151-74-2
C_{4}H_{9}ClSi	vinyldimethylchlorosilane	1719-58-0
C_{4}H_{9}Cl_{2}OP	butylphosphonic dichloride	2302-80-9
C_{4}H_{9}Cl_{3}Si	isobutyltrichlorosilane	18169-57-8
C_{4}H_{9}F_{3}O_{3}SSi	trimethylsilyl trifluoromethanesulfonate	27607-77-8
C_{4}H_{9}Li	butyl lithium	109-72-8
C_{4}H_{9}N	cyclobutylamine	2516-34-9
C_{4}H_{9}N	pyrrolidine	123-75-1
C_{4}H_{9}NaO	sodium tert-butoxide	865-48-5
C_{4}H_{9}NO	butanamide	541-35-5
C_{4}H_{9}NO	morpholine	110-91-8
C_{4}H_{9}NO_{2}	methylalanine	3913-67-5
C_{4}H_{9}NO_{2}	propylcarbamate	627-12-3
C_{4}H_{9}NO_{3}	butyl nitrate	928-45-0
C_{4}H_{9}NO_{3}	isobutyl nitrate	543-29-3
C_{4}H_{9}NO_{3}	threonine	72-19-5
C_{4}H_{9}NO_{4}	ammonium acid succinate	38457-08-8
C_{4}H_{9}NO_{6}	ammonium acid tartrate	3095-65-6
C_{4}H_{9}NS	dimethyl thioacetamide	631-67-4
C_{4}H_{9}NS	thiomorpholine	123-90-0
C_{4}H_{9}NSSi	trimethylsilyl isothiocyanate	2290-65-5
C_{4}H_{10}	butane	106-97-8
C_{4}H_{10}	isobutane	75-28-5
C_{4}H_{10}AlCl	diethylaluminumchloride	96-10-6
C_{4}H_{10}BCl	chlorodiethylborane	5314-83-0
C_{4}H_{10}BF_{3}O	boron trifluoride etherate	109-63-7
C_{4}H_{10}Be	diethylberyllium	542-63-2
C_{4}H_{10}Cl_{2}Si	dichlorodiethylsilane	1719-53-5
C_{4}H_{10}Cl_{2}Sn	diethyl dichloro tin	866-55-7
C_{4}H_{10}FO_{2}P	ethyl ethylphosphonofluoridate	650-20-4
C_{4}H_{10}FO_{2}P	propyl methylphosphonofluoridate	763-14-4
C_{4}H_{10}FO_{2}P	sarin	107-44-8
C_{4}H_{10}F_{3}NS	diethylaminosulfur trifluoride	38078-09-0
C_{4}H_{10}NO_{3}PS	acephate	30560-19-1
C_{4}H_{10}N_{2}	diethyldiazene	821-14-7
C_{4}H_{10}N_{2}	piperazine	110-85-0
C_{4}H_{10}N_{2}O	butyric acid hydrazide	3538-65-6
C_{4}H_{10}N_{4}O_{2}	butanedioyl dihydrazide	4146-43-4
C_{4}H_{10}N_{4}O_{2}S	mercaptosuccindihydrazide	687-57-0
C_{4}H_{10}N_{4}O_{2}S_{2}	dithiodiglycolic acid dihydrazide	6854-84-8
C_{4}H_{10}N_{4}S_{2}	ethylenediamine dihydrothiocyanate	22205-63-6
C_{4}H_{10}O	ethoxy ethane	60-29-7
C_{4}H_{10}O	methyl propyl ether	557-17-5
C_{4}H_{10}OS	diethyl sulfoxide	70-29-1
C_{4}H_{10}O_{2}	trimethylene glycol monomethyl ether	1589-49-7
C_{4}H_{10}O_{2}S	diethyl sulfone	597-35-3
C_{4}H_{10}O_{2}S	thiodiglycol	111-48-8
C_{4}H_{10}O_{4}S	butyl sulfuric acid	15507-13-8
C_{4}H_{10}O_{6}S_{3}	trimethylsulfonylmethane	67294-81-9
C_{4}H_{10}S	diethyl sulfide	352-93-2
C_{4}H_{10}S_{2}	methyl isopropyl disulfide	40136-65-0
C_{4}H_{10}S_{3}	methyl propyl trisulfide	17619-36-2
C_{4}H_{10}S_{4}	diethyl tetrasulfide	13730-34-2
C_{4}H_{10}Se_{2}	diethyl diselenide	628-39-7
C_{4}H_{10}Te_{2}	diethylditelluride	26105-63-5
C_{4}H_{10}Zn	diethylzinc	557-20-0
C_{4}H_{11}AsO_{2}	diethylarsinic acid	4964-27-6
C_{4}H_{11}BO_{2}	ethyldimethoxyborane	7318-82-3
C_{4}H_{11}ClSi	diethyldichlorosilane	1609-19-4
C_{4}H_{11}NO_{2}	aminoacetaldehyde dimethyl acetal	22483-09-6
C_{4}H_{11}NO_{2}	diethanolamine	111-42-2
C_{4}H_{11}NO_{8}P_{2}	glyphosine	2439-99-8
C_{4}H_{11}N_{3}O_{7}	diglycine nitrate	6845-92-7
C_{4}H_{11}O_{3}P	dimethyl ethylphosphonate	6163-75-3
C_{4}H_{11}O_{3}P	ethyl methyl methylphosphonate	18755-36-7
C_{4}H_{12}BrN	tetramethylammonium bromide	64-20-0
C_{4}H_{12}CdCl_{3}N	tetramethylammonium trichlorocadmate	15976-91-7
C_{4}H_{12}CdSe	dimethylcadmium·dimethylselenium	143481-65-6
C_{4}H_{12}ClN	tetramethylammonium chloride	75-57-0
C_{4}H_{12}GeO_{4}	tetramethoxygermanium	992-91-6
C_{4}H_{12}IN	tetramethylammonium iodide	75-58-1
C_{4}H_{12}N_{2}	tetramethylhydrazine	6415-12-9
C_{4}H_{12}N_{2}O_{4}	ammonium succinate	2226-88-2
C_{4}H_{12}N_{2}O_{6}	ammonium tartrate	3164-29-2
C_{4}H_{12}OSi	ethyldimethylsilanol	5906-73-0
C_{4}H_{12}OSi	trimethylsilylmethanol	3219-63-4
C_{4}H_{12}O_{4}Si	tetramethyl silicate	681-84-5
C_{4}H_{12}P_{2}	tetramethylbiphosphine	3676-91-3
C_{4}H_{12}SSi	trimethylsilyl methyl sulfide	3908-55-2
C_{4}H_{12}SZn	dimethylzinc dimethylsulfide complex	91071-61-3
C_{4}H_{12}SeZn	dimethylzinc dimethylselenium complex	108430-95-1
C_{4}H_{12}Si	diethylsilane	542-91-6
C_{4}H_{12}TeZn	dimethylzinc dimethyltellerium complex	127283-03-8
C_{4}H_{13}Cl_{2}N	tetramethylammonium hydrogen dichloride	5906-64-9
C_{4}H_{13}NSi	trimethylsilylmethylamine	18166-02-4
C_{4}H_{20}I_{2}N_{4}Pt	tetramethylammonium platinum iodide	131145-80-7
C_{4}Ho	holmium tetracarbide	12144-72-8
C_{4}I_{4}S	tetraiodothiophene	19259-11-1
C_{4}La	lanthanum tetracarbide	12603-31-5
C_{4}Lu	lutetium tetracarbide	37215-84-2
C_{4}N	cyanopropynylidene	129066-33-7
C_{4}N_{2}O	dicyanoketene	4361-47-1
C_{4}N_{2}O_{2}	oxalyl dicyanide	36086-83-6
C_{4}N_{2}S	dicyanothioketene	54856-36-9
C_{4}Nd	neodymium tetracarbide	12373-84-1
C_{4}NiO_{4}	nickel tetracarbonyl	13463-39-3
C_{4}Sc	scandium tetracarbide	12547-95-4
C_{4}Th	thorium tetracarbide	52931-63-2
C_{4}Ti	titanium tetracarbide	12547-96-5
C_{4}U	uranium tetracarbide	64539-55-5
C_{4}Y	monoyttrium tetracarbide	12547-98-7

== See also ==
- Four-carbon molecule listing all hydrocarbons
- Carbon number
- List of compounds with carbon number 3
- List of compounds with carbon number 5
