= C4H2N2 =

The molecular formula C_{4}H_{2}N_{2} (molar mass : 78.074 g/mol) may refer to:

- Maleonitrile
- Fumaronitrile
