= Bromothiophene =

Bromothiophene may refer to:

- 2-Bromothiophene
- 3-Bromothiophene
