= C4H3BrS =

The molecular formula C_{4}H_{3}BrS (molar mass: 163.04 g/mol, exact mass: 161.9139 u) may refer to:

- 2-Bromothiophene
- 3-Bromothiophene
