= C4H9NO3 =

The molecular formula C_{4}H_{9}NO_{3} may refer to:

- 2-Methylserine
- Allothreonine
- γ-Amino-β-hydroxybutyric acid
- Butyl nitrate
- Homoserine
- Threonine
