= Lamotrigine =

Anticonvulsant medication

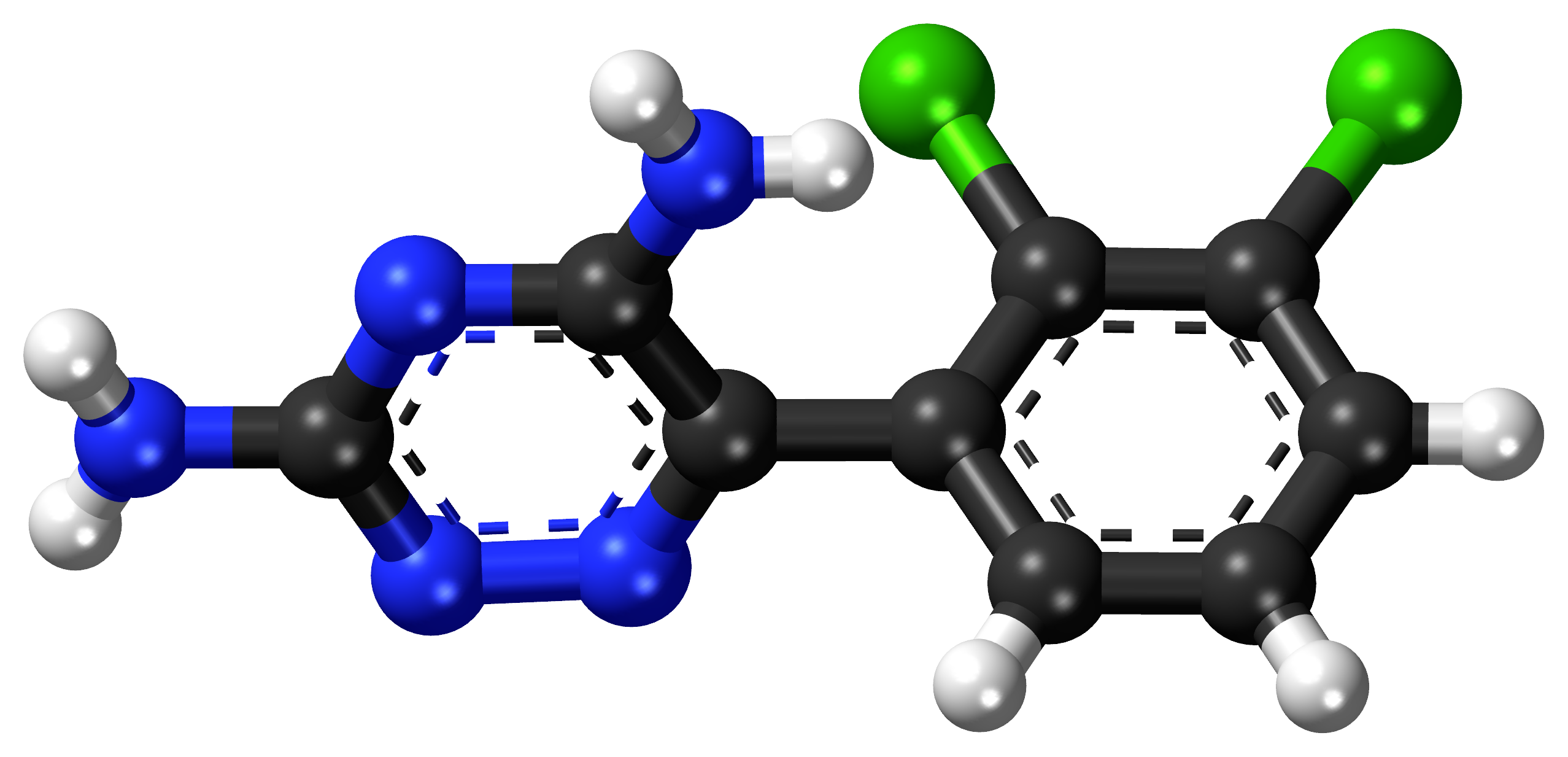

Clinical data
- Pronunciation: /ləˈmoʊtrɪˌdʒiːn/ lə-MOH-trih-jeen
- Trade names: Lamictal, Subvenite, others
- Other names: BW-430C; BW430C; 3,5-Diamino-6-(2,3-dichlorophenyl)-1,2,4-triazine
- AHFS/Drugs.com: Monograph
- MedlinePlus: a695007
- License data: US DailyMed: Lamotrigine
- Pregnancy category: AU: D
- Routes of administration: Oral (by mouth)
- Drug class: Phenyltriazine; anticonvulsant; mood stabilizer
- ATC code: N03AX09 (WHO)

Legal status
- Legal status: AU: S4 (Prescription only); BR: Class C1 (Other controlled substances); CA: ℞-only; UK: POM (Prescription only); US: ℞-only; EU: Rx-only

Pharmacokinetic data
- Bioavailability: 98%
- Protein binding: 55%
- Metabolism: Liver (mostly UGT1A4-mediated)
- Elimination half-life: 29 hours
- Excretion: Urine (65%), feces (2%)

Identifiers
- IUPAC name: 6-(2,3-dichlorophenyl)-1,2,4-triazine-3,5-diamine
- CAS Number: 84057-84-1
- PubChem CID: 3878
- IUPHAR/BPS: 2622
- DrugBank: DB00555
- ChemSpider: 3741
- UNII: U3H27498KS
- KEGG: D00354
- ChEBI: CHEBI:6367
- ChEMBL: ChEMBL741
- CompTox Dashboard (EPA): DTXSID2023195
- ECHA InfoCard: 100.074.432

Chemical and physical data
- Formula: C_{9}H_{7}Cl_{2}N_{5}
- Molar mass: 256.09 g·mol^{−1}
- 3D model (JSmol): Interactive image
- SMILES: NC1=NC(N)=NN=C1C2=CC=CC(Cl)=C2Cl
- InChI: InChI=1S/C9H7Cl2N5/c10-5-3-1-2-4(6(5)11)7-8(12)14-9(13)16-15-7/h1-3H,(H4,12,13,14,16); Key:PYZRQGJRPPTADH-UHFFFAOYSA-N

Lamotrigine (/ləˈmoʊtrɪˌdʒiːn/ luh-MOH-trih-jeen), sold under the brand name Lamictal among others, is a medication used to treat epilepsy and stabilize mood in bipolar disorder. For epilepsy, this includes focal seizures, tonic-clonic seizures, and seizures in Lennox-Gastaut syndrome. In bipolar disorder, lamotrigine has not been shown to reliably treat acute depression in any groups except for the severely depressed; but for patients with bipolar disorder who are not currently symptomatic, it appears to reduce the risk of future episodes of depression. Lamotrigine is also used off label for unipolar depression (major depressive disorder), treatment-resistant obsessive-compulsive disorder, and depersonalization-derealization disorder.

Common side effects include nausea, sleepiness, headache, vomiting, trouble with coordination, and rash. Serious side effects include excessive breakdown of red blood cells, increased risk of suicide, severe skin reaction (Stevens–Johnson syndrome), and allergic reactions, which can be fatal. Lamotrigine is a phenyltriazine, making it chemically different from other anticonvulsants. Its mechanism of action is not clear, but it appears to inhibit release of excitatory neurotransmitters via voltage-sensitive sodium channels and voltage-gated calcium channels in neurons.

Lamotrigine was first marketed in Ireland in 1991, and approved for use in the United States in 1994. It is on the World Health Organization's List of Essential Medicines. In 2023, it was the most commonly prescribed mood stabilizer and 59th most commonly prescribed medication in the United States, with more than 10 million prescriptions.

== Medical uses ==
=== Epilepsy ===
Lamotrigine is considered a first-line drug for generalized seizures (includes absence seizure, myoclonic seizure, atonic seizures, and secondarily generalized seizures such as focal-onset tonic-clonic seizures), and is used as an alternative or adjuvant medication for focal seizures. The evidence supporting the use of lamotrigine as an add-on therapy for drug-resistant generalized tonic-clonic seizures is not clear enough to inform clinical practice. Although low-certainty evidence suggests that it reduces generalized tonic-clonic seizures by 50%, the level of uncertainty indicates that the actual findings could be significantly different. Evidence supporting the use of lamotrigine as an add-on therapy for drug-resistant focal epilepsy found that it is likely effective for reducing seizure frequency and is generally well tolerated. Lamotrigine has some side effects including a risk of dizziness, nausea, ataxia, or visual disturbances such as diplopia. The long-term effects of lamotrigine have not been investigated.

==== Lennox–Gastaut syndrome ====
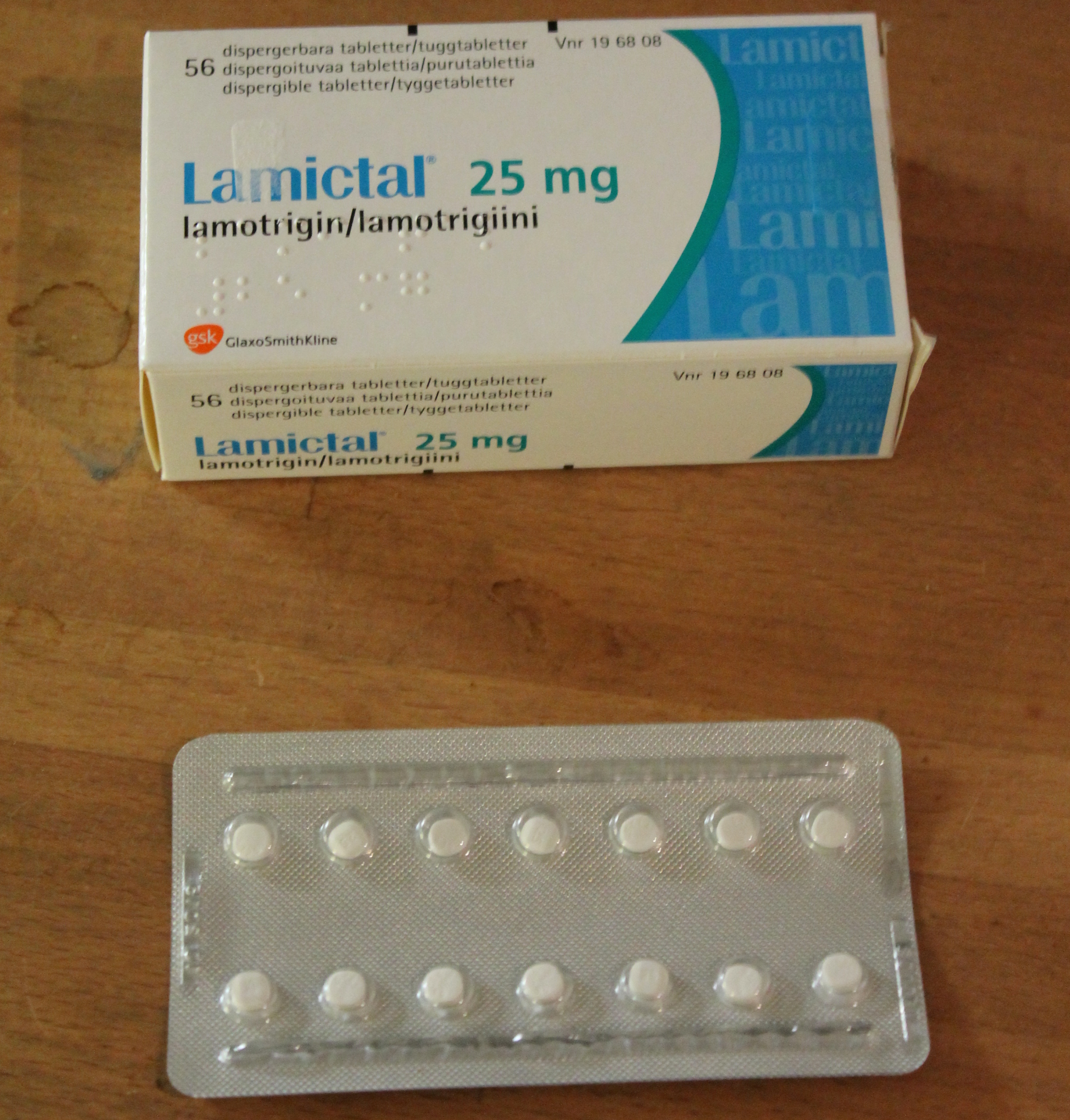
Lamictal® (lamotrigine) 25 mg blister pack

Lamotrigine is one of a small number of FDA-approved therapies for the form of epilepsy known as Lennox–Gastaut syndrome. It reduces the frequency of LGS seizures, and is one of two medications known to decrease the severity of drop attacks. Combination with valproate is common, but this increases the risk of Stevens–Johnson syndrome, and necessitates reduced dosing due to the interaction of these drugs.

=== Bipolar disorder ===
Lamotrigine is approved in the US for maintenance treatment of bipolar I disorder. While the anticonvulsants carbamazepine and valproate are predominantly antimanics, lamotrigine has demonstrated efficacy only in preventing or reducing the risk of recurrent depressive episodes of bipolar disorder. The drug seems ineffective in the treatment of current rapid-cycling, acute mania, or acute depression in bipolar disorder. Lamotrigine has been shown to be as effective as lithium, the standard treatment for bipolar disorder, in maintenance treatment.

Lamotrigine has not demonstrated clear efficacy in treating acute mood episodes, either mania or depression. It has not demonstrated effectiveness in treating acute mania, and there is controversy regarding the drug's effectiveness in treating acute bipolar depression. A paper written in 2008 by Ghaemi et al. reviewed evidence from trials that were unpublished and not referenced in the 2002 APA guidelines, and it concludes that lamotrigine has "very limited, if any, efficacy in the treatment of acute bipolar depression". A 2008 paper by Calabrese et al. examined much of the same data, and found that in five placebo-controlled studies, lamotrigine did not significantly differ from placebo in the treatment of bipolar depression. However, in a meta-analysis of these studies conducted in 2008, Geddes, Calabrese, and Goodwin found that lamotrigine was effective in individuals with bipolar depression, with a number needed to treat (NNT) of 11, or 7 in severe depression.

A 2013 review concluded that lamotrigine is recommended in bipolar maintenance when depression is prominent and that more research is needed regarding its role in the treatment of acute bipolar depression and unipolar depression. No information to recommend its use in other psychiatric disorders was found.

=== Schizophrenia ===
Lamotrigine, as a monotherapy, is not substantially effective against schizophrenia. However, various publications and textbooks have expressed that lamotrigine could be added to clozapine as augmentation therapy against partial or non-responding patients with schizophrenia. Patients had statistically significant improvements in positive, negative and affective symptoms. Lamotrigine does not have a statistically significant effect with antipsychotics other than clozapine, such as olanzapine, risperidone, haloperidol, and zuclopenthixol.

=== Other uses ===
Off-label uses include the treatment of major depressive disorder, peripheral neuropathy, trigeminal neuralgia, cluster headaches, migraines, visual snow, and reducing neuropathic pain from any cause. A systematic review conducted in 2013 concluded that well-designed clinical trials have shown no benefit for lamotrigine in neuropathic pain. Off-label psychiatric usage includes the treatment of treatment-resistant obsessive-compulsive disorder, depersonalization derealization disorder, hallucinogen persisting perception disorder, schizoaffective disorder, and borderline personality disorder. It has not been shown to be useful in post-traumatic stress disorder.

GlaxoSmithKline investigated lamotrigine for the treatment of ADHD with inconclusive results. No detrimental effects on cognitive function were observed; however, the only statistical improvement in core ADHD symptoms was an improvement on a Paced Auditory Serial Addition Test that measures auditory processing speed and calculation ability. Another study reported that lamotrigine might be a safe and effective treatment option for adult ADHD comorbid with bipolar, OCD, and recurrent depression.

== Side effects ==
Side effects such as rash, fever, and fatigue are very serious, as they may indicate incipient SJS, TEN, DRESS syndrome, or aseptic meningitis.

Lamotrigine prescribing information has a black box warning about life-threatening skin reactions, including Stevens–Johnson syndrome (SJS), DRESS syndrome, and toxic epidermal necrolysis (TEN). The manufacturer states that nearly all cases appear in the first two to eight weeks of therapy. Patients should seek medical attention for any unexpected skin rash, as its presence is an indication of a possible serious or even deadly side effect of the drug.

Not all rashes that occur while taking lamotrigine progress to SJS or TEN. Between 5 and 10% of patients will develop a rash, but only one in a thousand patients will develop a serious rash. Rash and other skin reactions are more common in children, so this medication is often reserved for adults.

For patients whose lamotrigine has been stopped after the development of a rash, rechallenge with lamotrigine is also a viable option. Usually, rechallenge is done by reinstating lamotrigine at a smaller dose (5mg/day). However, it does not apply to very serious cases. The incidence of these eruptions increases in patients who are currently on, or recently discontinued, a valproate-type anticonvulsant drug, as these medications interact in such a way that the clearance of both is decreased and the effective dose of lamotrigine is increased.

Due to the possibility of serious skin rashes, lamotrigine has a 5-week graduated dosing schedule for starting the medication.

In 2018, the FDA required a new warning for the risk of hemophagocytic lymphohistiocytosis. This serious reaction can occur between days to weeks after starting the treatment.

Other side effects include alopecia (hair loss), loss of balance or coordination, double vision, crossed eyes, pupil constriction, blurred vision, dizziness and lack of coordination, drowsiness, insomnia, anxiety, vivid dreams or nightmares, dry mouth, mouth ulcers, memory problems, mood changes, itchiness, runny nose, cough, nausea, indigestion, abdominal pain, weight loss, missed or painful menstrual periods, and vaginitis. The side-effects profile varies for different patient populations. Overall adverse effects in treatment are similar between men, women, geriatric, pediatric, and racial groups.

Lamotrigine has been associated with a decrease in white blood cell count (leukopenia). Lamotrigine does not prolong QT/QTc in Thorough QT (TQT) studies in healthy subjects.

In people taking antipsychotics, cases of lamotrigine-precipitated neuroleptic malignant syndrome have been reported.

=== Women ===
Women are more likely than men to have side effects.

Some evidence shows interactions between lamotrigine and female hormones, which can be of particular concern for women on estrogen-containing hormonal contraceptives. Ethinylestradiol, an ingredient of such contraceptives, has been shown to decrease serum levels of lamotrigine. Women starting an estrogen-containing oral contraceptive may need to increase the dosage of lamotrigine to maintain its level of efficacy. Likewise, women may experience an increase in lamotrigine side effects upon discontinuation of birth control pills. This may include the "pill-free" week where lamotrigine serum levels have been shown to increase twofold.

Many studies have found no association between lamotrigine exposure in utero and birth defects, while those that have found an association have found only slight associations with minor malformations such as cleft palates. Review studies have found that overall rates of congenital malformations in infants exposed to lamotrigine in utero are relatively low (1–4%), which is similar to the rate of malformations in the general population. It is known that lamotrigine is a weak inhibitor of human dihydrofolate reductase (DHFR) and other, more powerful, human DHFR inhibitors such as methotrexate are known to be teratogenic.

Lamotrigine is expressed in breast milk; the manufacturer recommends carefully weighing the benefits and risks of taking lamotrigine while breastfeeding. However, some studies suggest that lamotrigine is safe to use while breastfeeding. A frequently updated review of scientific literature rates lamotrigine as L3: moderately safe.

=== Other types of effects ===
Lamotrigine binds to melanin-containing tissues such as the iris of the eye or melanin-rich skin. The long-term consequences of this are unknown.

Lamotrigine is known to affect sleep. Studies with small numbers of patients (10–15) reported that lamotrigine increases the duration of REM sleep, decreases the number of phase shifts, and decreases the duration of slow-wave sleep, and that there was no effect on vigilance, daytime somnolence and cognitive function. However, a retrospective study of 109 patients' medical records found that 6.7% of patients experienced an "alerting effect" resulting in intolerable insomnia, for which the treatment had to be discontinued.

Lamotrigine can induce a type of seizure known as a myoclonic jerk, which tends to happen soon after the use of the medication. When used in the treatment of myoclonic epilepsies such as juvenile myoclonic epilepsy, lower doses (and lower plasma levels) are usually needed, as even moderate doses of this drug can induce seizures, including tonic-clonic seizures, which can develop into status epilepticus, which is a medical emergency. It can also cause myoclonic status epilepticus.

In overdose, lamotrigine can cause uncontrolled seizures in most people. Reported results in overdoses involving up to 15 g include increased seizures, coma, and death.

== Pharmacology ==
=== Mechanism of action ===
Lamotrigine is a member of the sodium channel blocking class of antiepileptic drugs. This may suppress the release of glutamate and aspartate, two dominant excitatory neurotransmitters in the central nervous system. It is generally accepted to be a member of the sodium channel blocking class of antiepileptic drugs, but it could have additional actions, since it has a broader spectrum of action than other sodium channel antiepileptic drugs such as phenytoin and is effective in the treatment of the depressed phase of bipolar disorder, whereas other sodium channel-blocking antiepileptic drugs are not, possibly on account of its sigma receptor activity. In addition, lamotrigine shares few side effects with other, unrelated anticonvulsants known to inhibit sodium channels, which further emphasizes its unique properties.

It is a triazine derivate that inhibits voltage-sensitive sodium channels, leading to stabilization of neuronal membranes. It also blocks L-, N-, and P-type calcium channels and weakly inhibits the serotonin 5-HT_{3} receptor. These actions are thought to inhibit release of glutamate at cortical projections in the ventral striatum limbic areas, and its neuroprotective and antiglutamatergic effects have been pointed out as promising contributors to its mood stabilizing activity. Observations that lamotrigine reduced GABA_{A} receptor-mediated neurotransmission in rat amygdala suggest that a GABAergic mechanism may also be involved. It appears that lamotrigine does not increase GABA blood levels in humans.

Lamotrigine does not have pronounced effects on any of the usual neurotransmitter receptors that anticonvulsants affect (adrenergic, dopamine D_{1} and D_{2}, muscarinic, GABA, histaminergic H_{1}, serotonin 5-HT_{2}, and N-methyl-D-aspartate). Inhibitory effects on 5-HT, norepinephrine, and dopamine transporters are weak. According to the article, the IC_{50} values are 240μM (5-HT, human platelets), 474 μM (5-HT, rat brain synaptosomes), 239 μM (norepinephrine) and 322 μM (dopamine).

Lamotrigine blocks NMDA receptor-initiated arachidonic acid signalling in rat brain. Lamotrigine is a weak inhibitor of dihydrofolate reductase, but whether this effect is sufficient to contribute to a mechanism of action or increases risk to the fetus during pregnancy is not known. Early studies of lamotrigine's mechanism of action examined its effects on the release of endogenous amino acids from rat cerebral cortex slices in vitro.

As is the case for antiepileptic drugs that act on voltage-dependent sodium channels, lamotrigine thereby inhibits the release of glutamate and aspartate, which is evoked by the sodium-channel activator veratrine and was less effective in the inhibition of acetylcholine or GABA release. At high concentrations, it did not affect spontaneous or potassium-evoked amino acid release.

These studies suggested that lamotrigine acts presynaptically on voltage-gated sodium channels to decrease glutamate release. Several electrophysiological studies have investigated the effects of lamotrigine on voltage-gated sodium channels. For example, lamotrigine blocked sustained repetitive firing in cultured mouse spinal cord neurons in a concentration-dependent manner, at concentrations that are therapeutically relevant in the treatment of human seizures. In cultured hippocampal neurons, lamotrigine reduced sodium currents in a voltage-dependent manner, and at depolarised potentials showed a small frequency-dependent inhibition. These and a variety of other results indicate that the antiepileptic effect of lamotrigine, like those of phenytoin and carbamazepine, is at least in part due to use- and voltage-dependent modulation of fast voltage-dependent sodium currents. However, lamotrigine has a broader clinical spectrum of activity than phenytoin and carbamazepine and is recognized to be protective against generalized absence epilepsy and other generalized epilepsy syndromes, including primary generalized tonic-clonic seizures, juvenile myoclonic epilepsy, and Lennox-Gastaut syndrome.

The basis for this broader spectrum of activity of lamotrigine is unknown but could relate to actions of the drug on voltage-gated calcium channels. Lamotrigine blocks T-type calcium channels weakly, if at all. However, it does inhibit native and recombinant high voltage-gated calcium channels (N- and P/Q/R-types) at therapeutic concentrations. Whether this activity on calcium channels accounts for lamotrigine's broader clinical spectrum of activity in comparison with phenytoin and carbamazepine remains to be determined.

=== Pharmacokinetics ===
The pharmacokinetics of lamotrigine follow first-order kinetics, with a half-life of 29 hours and volume of distribution of 1.36 L/kg. Lamotrigine is rapidly and completely absorbed after oral administration. Its absolute bioavailability is 98% and its plasma C_{max} occurs from 1.4 to 4.8 hours. Available data indicate that its bioavailability is not affected by food. Estimate of the mean apparent volume of distribution of lamotrigine following oral administration ranges from 0.9 to 1.3 L/kg. This is independent of dose and is similar to following single and multiple doses in both patients with epilepsy and in healthy volunteers.

Lamotrigine is inactivated by glucuronidation in the liver. Lamotrigine is metabolized predominantly by glucuronic acid conjugation. Its major metabolite is an inactive 2-n-glucuronide conjugate.

Lamotrigine has fewer drug interactions than many anticonvulsant drugs, although pharmacokinetic interactions with carbamazepine, phenytoin and other hepatic enzyme-inducing medications may shorten half-life. Dose adjustments should be made on clinical response, but monitoring may be of benefit in assessing compliance.

The capacity of available tests to detect potentially adverse consequences of melanin binding is unknown. Clinical trials excluded subtle effects and optimal duration of treatment. There are no specific recommendations for periodic ophthalmological monitoring. Lamotrigine binds to the eye and melanin-containing tissues which can accumulate over time and may cause toxicity. Prescribers should be aware of the possibility of long-term ophthalmologic effects and base treatment on clinical response. Patient compliance should be periodically reassessed with lab and medical testing of liver and kidney function to monitor progress or side effects.

== Chemistry ==
The first synthesis of lamotrigine was disclosed in a patent file by the Wellcome Foundation in 1980. 2,3-Dichlorobenzoyl chloride is treated with cuprous cyanide to form an acyl cyanide. This is then reacted with the nitrate salt of aminoguanidine to give an intermediate which is cyclised to the diamino triazine of the drug product.

== History ==
- 1980 — initial patent filings are made by the Wellcome Foundation.
- 1990 — lamotrigine is approved for use in Ireland to treat epilepsy.
- 1991 — lamotrigine is used in the United Kingdom as an anticonvulsant medication
- December 1994 — lamotrigine was approved for use in the United States for the treatment of partial seizures.
- August 1998 — for use as adjunctive treatment of Lennox-Gastaut syndrome in pediatric and adult patients, new dosage form: chewable dispersible tablets.
- December 1998 — for use as monotherapy for the treatment of partial seizures in adult patients when converting from a single enzyme-inducing anticonvulsant drug.
- January 2003 — for use as adjunctive therapy for partial seizures in pediatric patients as young as two years of age.
- June 2003 — approved for maintenance treatment of depression in bipolar I disorder.
- January 2004 — for use as monotherapy for the treatment of partial seizures in adult patients when converting from the anti-epileptic drug valproate (including valproic acid)

== Society and culture ==
=== Brand names ===
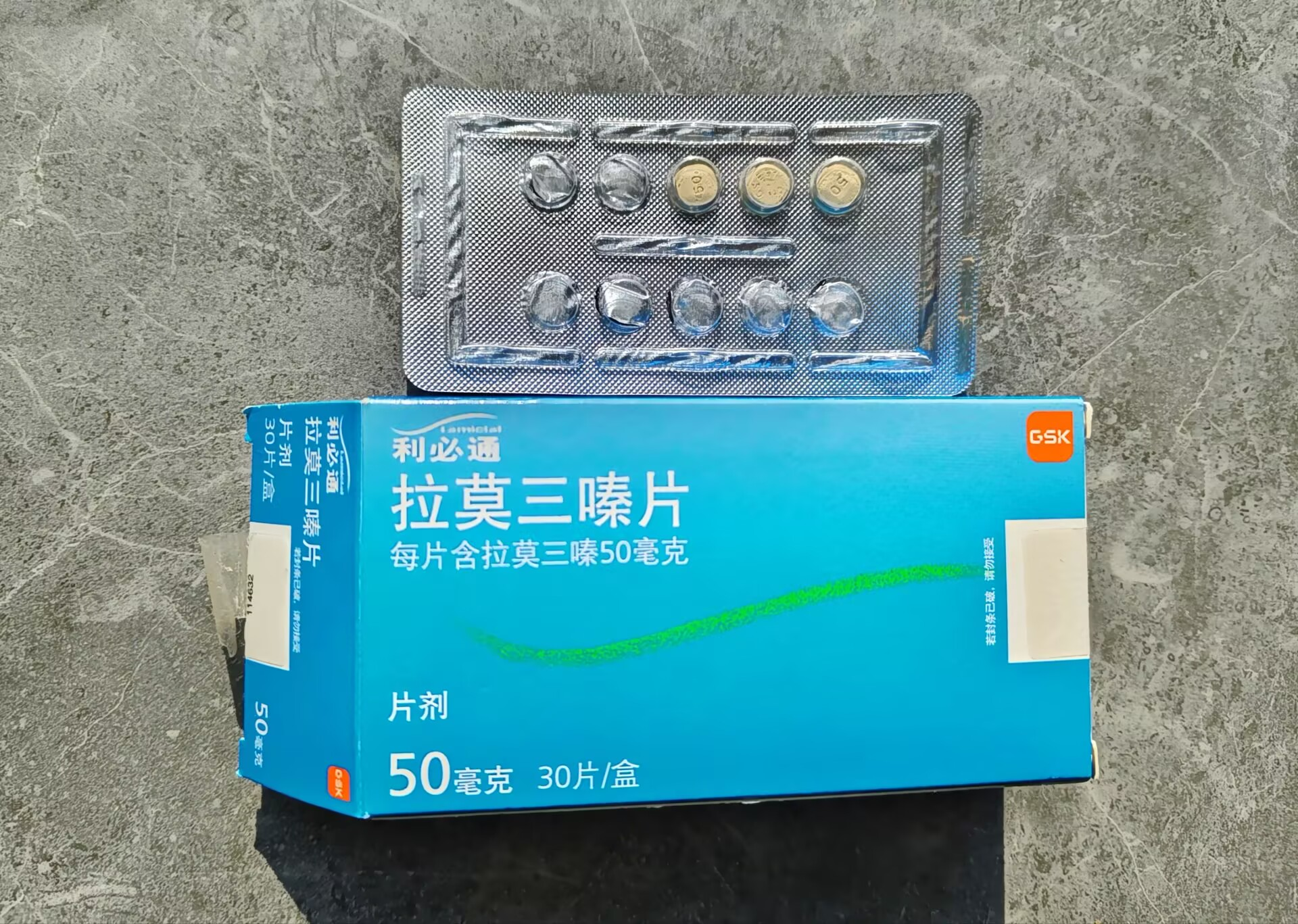
Lamictal 50mg tablets marketed in China

Lamotrigine is sold under the original brand name Lamictal and it is available in generic form under many brand names worldwide.

Lamotrigine is also available in 5-week starter "convenience packs" to help patients with the graduated dosing schedule.

== Regulatory advisory in 2021 ==
In March 2021, the United States Food and Drug Administration (FDA) issued a warning regarding the potential for cardiac arrhythmias in people with pre-existing structural or conduction heart defects. The warning provoked consternation and controversy within the professional community.

An in vitro study conducted in 2011 predicted Class IB antiarrhythmic activity at therapeutic concentrations of lamotrigine, due to its sodium channel-blocking activity. Thus, lamotrigine use in at-risk populations could prolong the QRS interval on the electrocardiogram, and increase the risk of arrhythmias and sudden death. No references to human studies or postmarket data in at-risk populations (i.e., people with structural heart disease) were cited to support the warning. A study in dogs is mentioned in the prescribing information brochure by the manufacturer. A rapid systematic review concluded that "there is insufficient evidence to support or refute that lamotrigine is associated with sudden death or electrocardiogram changes..." The FDA has recommended that further studies are conducted with lamotrigine and other sodium-channel blocking antiseizure medications.

In March 2023, an FDA Adverse Event Reporting System analysis demonstrated signals of cardiac arrest, but not of tachyarrhythmia or bradyarrhythmia nor their clinical manifestation as fainting in lamotrigine. The study stratified the epileptic and psychiatric indications, explaining that the nature of the signal for cardiac arrest seems to be confounded by the psychiatric indication, which included 2.5 times more concomitant medications with cardiac adverse events, such as QT-prolonging drugs. Additionally, a 1.5-fold greater reports on overdose and suicide attempts was recorded in the psychiatric reports. Although lamotrigine blocks the cardiac sodium channels at therapeutically relevant concentrations, owing to its short-fast kinetics at the channel level, this blockage did not translate into a disproportional signal in this study.

== Research ==
Though lamotrigine has been used to treat seizures in infants, as of 2023, its effectiveness in this age group has been evaluated in only one study. Adverse effects were rarely severe enough for the medication to be discontinued in this age group, however, its effectiveness in reducing seizures was inconclusive.
