= 2-alkyn-1-ol dehydrogenase =

Class of enzymes

Identifiers
- EC no.: 1.1.1.165
- CAS no.: 54576-94-2

Databases
- IntEnz: IntEnz view
- BRENDA: BRENDA entry
- ExPASy: NiceZyme view
- KEGG: KEGG entry
- MetaCyc: metabolic pathway
- PRIAM: profile
- PDB structures: RCSB PDB PDBe PDBsum
- Gene Ontology: AmiGO / QuickGO
Search
- PMC: articles
- PubMed: articles
- NCBI: proteins

In enzymology, 2-alkyn-1-ol dehydrogenase (EC 1.1.1.165) is an enzyme that catalyzes the chemical reaction below:

1,4-Butynediol
+ NAD^{+}
H^{+}
H^{+}
4-Hydroxybut-2-ynal
+ NADH

The two substrates of this enzyme are 1,4-butynediol and oxidised nicotinamide adenine dinucleotide (NAD^{+}). Its products are 4-hydroxybut-2-ynal, reduced NADH, and a proton.

This enzyme belongs to the family of oxidoreductases, specifically those acting on the CH-OH group of donor with NAD^{+} or NADP^{+} as acceptor. The systematic name of this enzyme class is 2-butyne-1,4-diol:NAD^{+} 1-oxidoreductase.
