= C4H7N5 =

The molecular formula C_{4}H_{7}N_{5} (molar mass: 125.13 g/mol) may refer to:

- 2,4,6-Triaminopyrimidine
- Acetoguanamine
