= Amezinium metilsulfate =

Chemical compound

Clinical data
- AHFS/Drugs.com: International Drug Names
- Routes of administration: Oral
- ATC code: C01CA25 (WHO)

Legal status
- Legal status: In general: ℞ (Prescription only)

Identifiers
- IUPAC name: 6-Methoxy-1-phenylpyridazin-1-ium-4-amine; methyl sulfate
- CAS Number: 30578-37-1
- PubChem CID: 71926
- ChemSpider: 64937
- UNII: 03NR868ICX
- KEGG: D01304
- ChEBI: CHEBI:31201
- ChEMBL: ChEMBL2106667
- CompTox Dashboard (EPA): DTXSID00184657
- ECHA InfoCard: 100.045.665

Chemical and physical data
- Formula: C_{12}H_{15}N_{3}O_{5}S
- Molar mass: 313.33 g·mol^{−1}
- 3D model (JSmol): Interactive image
- SMILES: COC1=[N+](N=CC(=C1)N)C2=CC=CC=C2.COS(=O)(=O)[O-]
- InChI: InChI=1S/C11H11N3O.CH4O4S/c1-15-11-7-9(12)8-13-14(11)10-5-3-2-4-6-10;1-5-6(2,3)4/h2-8,12H,1H3;1H3,(H,2,3,4); Key:ZEASXVYVFFXULL-UHFFFAOYSA-N

Amezinium metilsulfate (INN, sold under the brand name Regulton, is a sympathomimetic drug which is widely used in the treatment of orthostatic hypotension in Japan.

== Pharmacology ==
=== Pharmacodynamics ===
Amezinium metilsulfate has a unique mechanism of action of acting as a dual monoamine oxidase inhibitor (MAOI) and norepinephrine reuptake inhibitor (NRI).

== Chemistry ==
=== Synthesis ===
This drug is made from 2-butyne-1,4-diol starting material with chloridazon as an intermediate.

Thieme ChemDrug Synthesis:

The halogenation of 2-butyne-1,4-diol (1) with chlorine gives mucochloric acid (2). Treatment with phenylhydrazine (3) gives 1-phenyl-4,5-dichloro-6-pyridazone (4). Addition of ammonia leads to chloridazon (5). Catalytic hydrogenation yields 5-amino-2-phenylpyridazin-3-one (6). Alkylation with dimethyl sulfate completes the synthesis of amezinium metisulfate (7).

== See also ==
- List of investigational orthostatic intolerance drugs
