= 1,4-Butynediol =

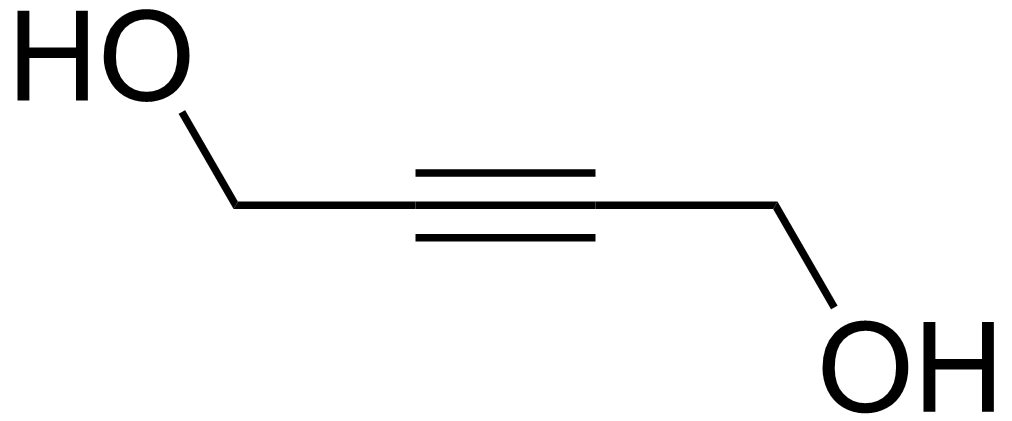

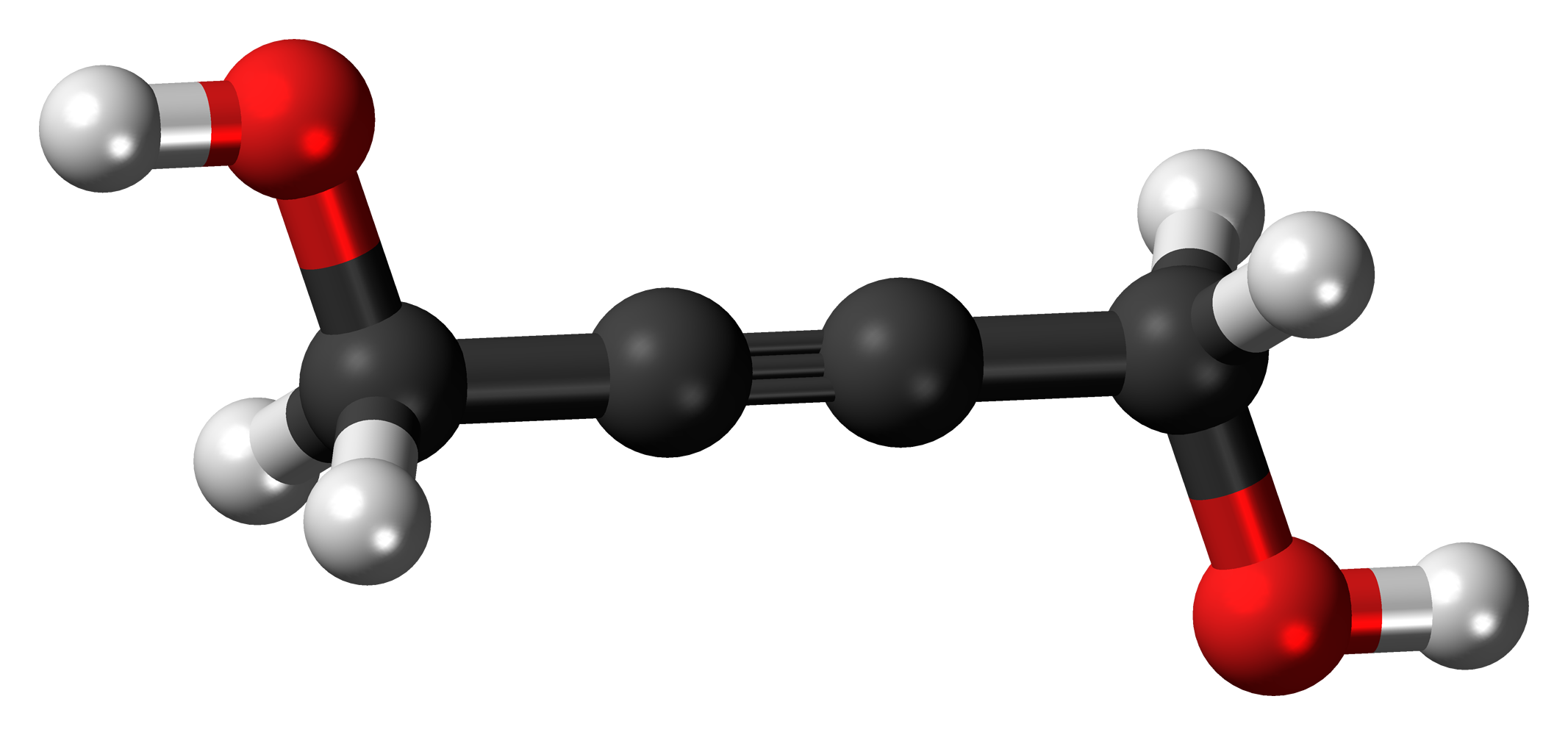

Names
- Preferred IUPAC name But-2-yne-1,4-diol
- Other names Butynediol; 2-Butyne-1,4-diol; 1,4-Dihydroxy-2-butyne

Identifiers
CAS Number	110-65-6
3D model (JSmol)	Interactive image
ChEBI	CHEBI:16413
ChEMBL	ChEMBL3187551
ChemSpider	7775
ECHA InfoCard	100.003.445
EC Number	203-788-6
KEGG	C02497
PubChem CID	8066
RTECS number	ES0525000
UNII	AXH202FPQM
UN number	2716
CompTox Dashboard (EPA)	DTXSID4021921
- InChI: InChI=1S/C4H6O2/c5-3-1-2-4-6/h5-6H,3-4H2 Key: DLDJFQGPPSQZKI-UHFFFAOYSA-N; InChI=1/C4H6O2/c5-3-1-2-4-6/h5-6H,3-4H2 Key: DLDJFQGPPSQZKI-UHFFFAOYAT
- SMILES: OCC#CCO

Properties
Chemical formula	C_{4}H_{6}O_{2}
Molar mass	86.090 g·mol^{−1}
Appearance	Colorless crystalline solid
Density	1.11 g/cm^{3} (at 20 °C)
Melting point	58 °C (136 °F; 331 K)
Boiling point	238 °C (460 °F; 511 K)
Solubility in water	3740 g/L

Hazards
- GHS labelling
Pictograms	(GHS05: Corrosive) (GHS06: Toxic) (GHS07: Exclamation mark) (GHS08: Health hazard)
Signal word	Danger
Hazard statements	H301, H312, H314, H317, H331, H373
Precautionary statements	P260, P264, P270, P271, P272, P280, P301+P310, P301+P330+P331, P302+P352, P303+P361+P353, P304+P340, P305+P351+P338, P310, P311, P312, P314, P321, P322, P330, P333+P313, P363, P403+P233, P405, P501
NFPA 704 (fire diamond)	2 1 0
Flash point	~136 °C (277 °F)
- Except where otherwise noted, data are given for materials in their standard state (at 25 °C [77 °F], 100 kPa). verify (what is ?) Infobox references

1,4-Butynediol is an organic compound that is an alkyne and a diol. It is a colourless, hygroscopic solid that is soluble in water and polar organic solvents. It is a commercially significant compound in its own right and as a precursor to other products.

== Synthesis ==
1,4-Butynediol can be produced in the Reppe synthesis, where formaldehyde and acetylene are the reactants:

2 CH_{2}O + HC≡CH → HOCH_{2}CCCH_{2}OH

Several patented production methods use copper bismuth catalysts coated on an inert material. The normal temperature range for the reaction is 90 °C up to 150 °C, depending on the pressure used for the reaction which can range from 1 to 20 bar.

== Applications ==
1,4-Butynediol is a precursor to 1,4-butanediol and 2-butene-1,4-diol by hydrogenation. It is also used in the manufacture of certain herbicides, textile additives, corrosion inhibitors, plasticizers, synthetic resins, and polyurethanes. It is the major raw material used in the synthesis of vitamin B_{6}. It is also used for brightening, preserving, and inhibiting nickel plating.

It reacts with a mixture of chlorine and hydrochloric acid to give mucochloric acid (HO_{2}CC(Cl)=C(Cl)CHO).

Named uses of 1,4-butynediol include: Chloridazon, Amezinium metilsulfate & Barban.

== Safety ==
1,4-Butynediol is corrosive and irritates the skin, eyes, and respiratory tract.

== See also ==
- Acetylenedicarboxylic acid (but-2-ynedioic acid, 2-butynedioic acid)
- cis-Butene-1,4-diol
- 2-Butyne (but-2-yne)
