= C4H11NO =

The molecular formula C_{4}H_{11}NO (molar mass: 89.14 g/mol, exact mass: 89.08406 u) may refer to:

- 4-Amino-1-butanol
- Aminomethyl propanol
- Diethylhydroxylamine (DEHA)
- Dimethylethanolamine (DMAE or DMEA)
