= C3H3NO =

The molecular formula C_{3}H_{3}NO (molar mass: 69.06 g/mol, exact mass: 69.02146 u) may refer to:

- Acetyl cyanide
- Isoxazole
- Oxazole
- Propiolic acid amide
