= 2,4,6-Triaminopyrimidine =

Names
- Preferred IUPAC name Pyrimidine-2,4,6-triamine

Identifiers
CAS Number	1004-38-2
3D model (JSmol)	Interactive image
ChEBI	CHEBI:39857
ChEMBL	ChEMBL571518
ChemSpider	13263
ECHA InfoCard	100.012.473
EC Number	213-720-7
Gmelin Reference	405732
PubChem CID	13863
UNII	D6ZP6F2ECK
CompTox Dashboard (EPA)	DTXSID3061394
- InChI: InChI=1S/C4H7N5/c5-2-1-3(6)9-4(7)8-2/h1H,(H6,5,6,7,8,9) Key: JTTIOYHBNXDJOD-UHFFFAOYSA-N
- SMILES: C1=C(N=C(N=C1N)N)N

Properties
Chemical formula	C_{4}H_{7}N_{5}
Molar mass	125,13 g·mol^{−1}
- Except where otherwise noted, data are given for materials in their standard state (at 25 °C [77 °F], 100 kPa). Infobox references

2,4,6-Triaminopyrimidine is a pyrimidine (1,3-diazine) carrying three symmetrically arranged amino groups and has been proposed as a potential prebiotic nucleic base analog. Pyrimidine triamine serves as a starting material for the production of hair dyes and explosives, but most notably for the vitamin folic acid and for pharmaceuticals such as malaria treatments, the cytostatic agents aminopterin and methotrexate, as well as the diuretic triamterene.

== Occurrence and preparation ==
In 1905, Wilhelm Traube reported the synthesis of 2,4,6-triaminopyrimidine from malonic acid dinitrile and guanidine in the presence of sodium methanolate using ethanol as solvent.

Synthesis of 2,4,6-triaminopyrimidine

The product can be isolated from the solution as a well-crystallizing sulfate. When a more manageable guanidine salt is used, e.g. guanidine hydrochloride, the base sodium methanolate is added to liberate free guanidine. Because the aromatic triamine is highly sensitive to oxidation, all operations must be carried out under exclusion of air.

The synthesis of TAP using guanidine bound to polystyrene according to the principle of a Merrifield synthesis, with malodinitrile and subsequent cleavage using trifluoroacetic acid under microwave chemistry conditions, has also been reported to yield very high product quantities (92%) within short reaction times.

== Properties ==
Pure 2,4,6-triaminopyrimidine is a white crystalline solid "which precipitates in long needles when recrystallized from hot, dilute alcohol". The substance rapidly forms dark brown oxidation products upon exposure to air. TAP is highly soluble in water (36.5 g/kg at 20 °C) and in methanol (22.7 g/kg at 20 °C), but less soluble in ethanol (4.5 g/kg at 20 °C).

== Applications ==
The spontaneous reaction of 2,4,6-triaminopyrimidine with ribose under simulated conditions of chemical evolution forms a nucleoside TAP–ribose conjugate that associates with complementary cyanuric acid. This reaction serves as a model for the prebiotic formation of ribonucleic acid (pre-RNA).

Conjugate of 2,4,6-triaminopyrimidine and ribose

Reaction of 2,4,6-triaminopyrimidine with the sodium salt of nitromalonaldehyde (prepared from mucobromic acid and nitrous acid) yields a heteroaromatic compound (A), which is subsequently converted in two steps into an inhibitor of dihydrofolate reductase active against Pneumocystis carinii and Toxoplasma gondii.

DHFR inhibitor from TAP

Treatment of 2,4,6-triaminopyrimidine with nitrous acid (HNO_{2}) affords the 5-nitroso compound (I), which can be further reduced using ammonium sulfide (NH_{4})_{2}S, sodium dithionite (Na_{2}S_{2}O_{4}), zinc dust/hydrochloric acid, or more effectively by catalytic hydrogenation over palladium to yield 2,4,5,6-tetraaminopyrimidine in das u. a. als Entwickler für oxidative Haarfarben (II).

Synthesis of 2,4,5,6-tetraaminopyrimidine from TAP

5-Nitroso-2,4,6-triaminopyrimidine (I) can also be obtained directly in a one-pot reaction from the starting materials used for TAP without intermediate isolation, providing very good yields.

In an early synthetic route for the potassium-sparing diuretic triamterene, 5-nitroso-2,4,6-triaminopyrimidine (I) is cyclized with phenylacetonitrile in the presence of sodium methanolate to yield the final product.

Synthesis of triamterene from TAP (last step)

The extensive work conducted between 1970 and 2000 on the synthesis of 2,4,5,6-tetraaminopyrimidine from 2,4,6-triaminopyrimidine was driven by the high demand for this tetramine as a precursor for triamterene and particularly for the vitamin folic acid and its antagonists used in cancer therapy, such as aminopterin and especially methotrexate.

Folic acid and antagonists derived from TAP
