= Acetyl cyanide =

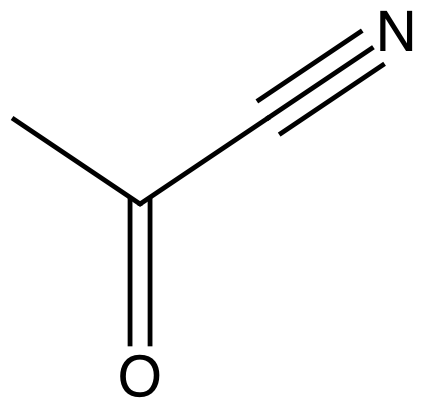
- Acetyl cyanide

Names
- Preferred IUPAC name Acetyl cyanide
- Systematic IUPAC name Ethanoyl cyanide
- Other names 2-Oxopropanenitrile; Pyruvonitrile; Propanenitrile, 2-oxo- α-Oxopropionitrile; Oxopropionitrile; Oxypropionitrile; Pyruvic acid nitrile 2-Oxopropionitrile; 2-Oxopropiononitrile

Identifiers
CAS Number	631-57-2
3D model (JSmol)	Interactive image
Beilstein Reference	1737633
ChemSpider	62638
ECHA InfoCard	100.010.146
EC Number	211-159-2
PubChem CID	69430
UNII	ULO441649V
CompTox Dashboard (EPA)	DTXSID10212430
- InChI: InChI=1S/C3H3NO/c1-3(5)2-4/h1H3 Key: QLDHWVVRQCGZLE-UHFFFAOYSA-N
- SMILES: CC(=O)C#N

Properties
Chemical formula	C_{3}H_{3}NO
Molar mass	69.063 g·mol^{−1}
Appearance	Clear, yellow liquid
Density	0.9745 g/cm^{3}
Boiling point	92.3 °C (198.1 °F; 365.4 K)
Vapor pressure	51.93 mmHg
Refractive index (n_{D})	1.3764
Specific Surface Area	40.86 Å^{2}

Hazards
- Occupational safety and health (OHS/OSH)
Ingestion hazards	Toxic if swallowed
Inhalation hazards	Toxic if inhaled. Causes respiratory tract irritation
Eye hazards	Causes eye irritation
Skin hazards	May be harmful if absorbed through skin. Causes skin irritation.
- GHS labelling
Pictograms	(GHS02: Flammable) (GHS06: Toxic)
Signal word	Danger
Hazard statements	H225, H301, H315, H331, H335, H401, H412
Precautionary statements	P210, P261, P273, P301+P310, P311
NFPA 704 (fire diamond)	2 3 0
Flash point	14.44 °C (57.99 °F; 287.59 K)
Safety data sheet (SDS)	External MSDS
- Except where otherwise noted, data are given for materials in their standard state (at 25 °C [77 °F], 100 kPa). verify (what is ?) Infobox references

Acetyl cyanide is the organic compound with the formula CH_{3}C(O)CN. It is an acyl cyanide. Acetyl cyanide is a colorless liquid.

== Structure ==
Its structure was determined through the use of electron diffraction intensities and rotational spectroscopy.

== Reactions ==
Two main types of reactions can occur with acetyl cyanide as a reactant; aldol condensation and enolate substitution. Aldol condensation can occur when acetyl cyanide reacts with (Z)-but-2-enal to form (2E,4E)-hexa-2,4-dienoyl cyanide:

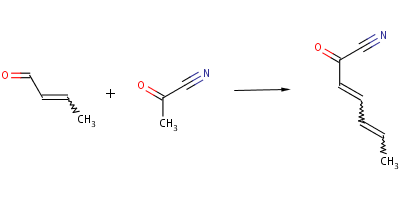

The photochemical and thermal reactions of acetyl cyanide have been extensively studied. For example, formyl cyanide does not undergo unimolecular decomposition to HCN and CO spontaneously. However, acetyl cyanide, also a member of this family, breaks down through this unimolecular decomposition at 470 °C. This reaction occurs through decarbonylation. This division of the molecule to a ketone and hydrogen cyanide were noted to be under competitive circumstances. This caused a study of the thermal unimolecular reactions that acetyl cyanide undergoes.

The unimolecular decompositions that acetyl cyanide undergo have been confirmed to be less energetically favorable than the molecule undergoing isomerization to acetyl isocyanide. However, through other photolysis experiments have resulted in the formation of a CN radical through acetyl cyanide decomposing into CH_{3}CO + CN or CH_{3}COCN.

=== Synthesis ===
Acetyl cyanide is prepared from acetyl chloride and cyanide sources, often in the presence of copper catalysts. Acetyl cyanide is also synthesized at 350 °C from ketene and hydrogen cyanide.

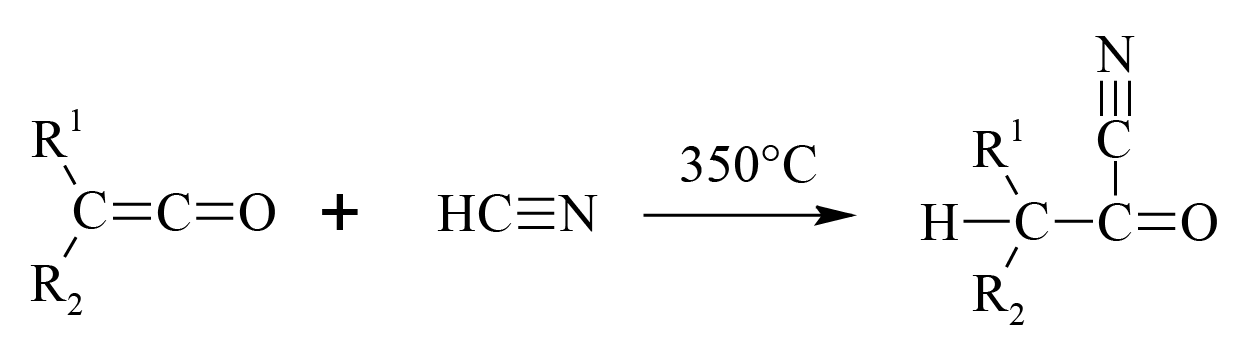
