= Acyl cyanide =

Chemical group (–C(O)C≡N)

General chemical structure of an acyl cyanide

In organic chemistry, an acyl cyanide is a functional group with the formula R−C(O)CN and structure R−C(=O)−C≡N. It consists of an acyl group (R−C=O) attached to cyanide (−C≡N). Examples include acetyl cyanide, formyl cyanide, and oxalyl dicyanide. Acyl cyanides are reagents in organic synthesis.

== Synthesis ==
Classically acyl cyanides are produced by the salt metathesis reaction of acyl chlorides with sodium cyanide:

$${\color{red}\ce{R-C(O)}}\ce{Cl}  +  \ce{Na}{\color{red}\ce{CN}} \longrightarrow {\color{red}\ce{R-C(O)CN}}  +  \ce{NaCl}$$

Alternatively, they can be produced by dehydration of acyl aldoximes:

$${\color{red}\ce{R-C(O)C}}\ce{H=}{\color{red}\ce{N}}\ce{OH} \longrightarrow {\color{red}\ce{R-C(O)CN}}  +  \ce{H2O}$$

Acetyl cyanide is also prepared by hydrocyanation of ketene:

$$\ce{CH2=}{\color{red}\ce{C=O}} +  \ce{H}{\color{red}\ce{CN}}  \longrightarrow \ce{H3C -}{\color{red}\ce{C(O)CN}}$$

== Reactions ==
Acyl cyanides are mild acylating agents and the traditional acylant in the Reissert reaction.

In aqueous base, acyl cyanides break down to cyanide and the carboxylate:
$${\color{red}\ce{R-C(O)CN}}  +  \ce{2 NaOH} \longrightarrow  {\color{red}\ce{R-CO}}\ce{_2Na}  +  \ce{Na}{\color{red}\ce{CN}}  +  \ce{H2O}$$
Nickel(II) catalyzes benzoyl cyanide decarbonylation to the benzonitrile.

Acyl cyanides are hetero (oxa) dienophiles. They click onto azides to give acyl tetrazoles.
