= Four-carbon molecule =

Class of chemical compounds

Four-carbon molecules are based on a skeleton made from four carbon atoms. They may be in a chain, branched chains, cycles or even bicyclic compounds

C_{4}H_{4} isomers with CAS registry numbers

Hydrocarbons that include four carbon atoms are:

- butane C_{4}H_{10}
- isobutane C_{4}H_{10}
- but-1-ene C_{4}H_{8}
- but-2-ene C_{4}H_{8}
- but-1-yne C_{4}H_{6}
- but-2-yne C_{4}H_{6}
- isobutylene C_{4}H_{8}
- butadiene C_{4}H_{6}
- 1,2-butadiene C_{4}H_{6}
- vinylacetylene C_{4}H_{4}
- diacetylene C_{4}H_{2}
- butatriene C_{4}H_{4}
- cyclobutane C_{4}H_{8}
- cyclobutene C_{4}H_{6}
- cyclobutyne C_{4}H_{4}
- cyclobutadiene C_{4}H_{4}
- methylenecyclopropene C_{4}H_{4}
- bicyclobutane C_{4}H_{6}
- 1-bicyclobutene C_{4}H_{4}
- Δ^{1,3}-bicyclobutene C_{4}H_{4}
- propalene C_{4}H_{2}
- methylcyclopropane C_{4}H_{8}
- 1-methylcyclopropene C_{4}H_{6}
- 3-methylcyclopropene C_{4}H_{6}
- methylenecyclopropane C_{4}H_{6}
- 3-methylcyclopropyne C_{4}H_{4}
- methylenecyclopropyne C_{4}H_{2}
- tetrahedrane C_{4}H_{4}

== See also ==
- List of compounds with carbon number 4
