= Phenyltriazines =

Class of chemical compounds

Chemical structure of lamotrigine

Phenyltriazines are a class of molecules containing a phenyl group and a triazine group. These molecules are pharmacologically important. As an example, lamotrigine is a phenyltriazine derivative used as an anticonvulsant drug and has been shown to be useful for alleviating epilepsy and bipolar disorder.
