= Lysidine =

Chemical compound name

Lysidine may refer to:

- Lysidine (nucleoside) (C_{15}H_{25}N_{5}O_{6}), a nucleoside
- Lysidine (imidazoline) (C_{4}H_{8}N_{2}), an imidazoline
