= C10H18O4 =

The molecular formula C_{10}H_{18}O_{4} (molar mass: 202.25 g/mol) may refer to:

- Sebacic acid
- 1,4-Butanediol diglycidyl ether
