= Trimethylsilyl isothiocyanate =

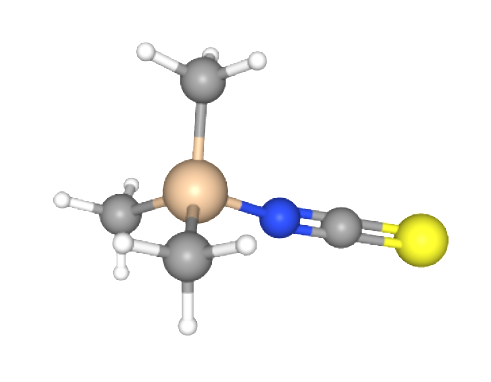

Names
- IUPAC name isothiocyanato(trimethyl)silane
- Other names: TMSNCS; Trimethylsilyl isothiocyanate; Isothiocyanatotrimethylsilane; Silane, isothiocyanatotrimethyl-; (Trimethylsilyl)isothiocyanate; TMS-isothiocyanate

Identifiers
CAS Number	2290-65-5
3D model (JSmol)	Interactive image
ChemSpider	67839
ECHA InfoCard	100.017.209
EC Number	218-929-7
PubChem CID	75297
UNII	JK38S9F7MN
CompTox Dashboard (EPA)	DTXSID4062307
- InChI: InChI=1S/C4H9NSSi/c1-7(2,3)5-4-6/h1-3H3 Key: XLTUPERVRFLGLJ-UHFFFAOYSA-N
- SMILES: C[Si](C)(C)N=C=S

Properties
Chemical formula	C_{4}H_{9}NSSi
Molar mass	131.27 g·mol^{−1}
Density	0.931 g·mL^{−1}
Melting point	−32.8 °C (−27.0 °F; 240.3 K)
Boiling point	143 °C (289 °F; 416 K)
Solubility in water	Reacts with water
Vapor pressure	100 mmHg

Hazards
- GHS labelling
Pictograms	(GHS02: Flammable) (GHS06: Toxic) (GHS07: Exclamation mark) (GHS08: Health hazard)
Signal word	Danger
Hazard statements	H226, H301, H311, H315, H319, H331, H334, H335
NFPA 704 (fire diamond)	3 2 0
Flash point	29 °C (84 °F; 302 K)
Safety data sheet (SDS)	External MSDS
- Except where otherwise noted, data are given for materials in their standard state (at 25 °C [77 °F], 100 kPa). Infobox references

Trimethylsilyl isothiocyanate (TMSNCS) is an organosilicon compound that contains an isothiocyanate whose nitrogen atom is covalently bonded to a trimethylsilyl group. The isothiocyanate group is an analog of the isocyanate group, but having a sulfur instead of oxygen.

== Reactions ==
TMSNCS is useful reagent in organic chemistry. It is an ambident nucleophile, able to react with various alkyl halides, acetals, aldehydes, unsaturated compounds, aziridines, oxiranes, polycyclic aromatic hydrocarbons, and acetylated hexoses to form either thiocyanate or isothiocyanate structures. As an electrophile, it can react with other nucleophiles to form thioamide types of structures, some of which can undergo subsequent reactions to form heterocycles.

=== Halide substitutions ===
As a sulfur nucleophile, TMSNCS substitutes for halides on a range of alkyl substrates, giving alkyl thiocyanates. These substitution reactions involve tetrabutylammonium fluoride used as phase-transfer catalyst and occur under particularly mild conditions.

=== Reactions with aldehydes and acetals ===
As a nitrogen nucleophile, TMSNCS adds across the carbonyl group of aldehydes and substitutes isothiocyanate for one of the ether groups on acetals via acid-catalyzed processes.

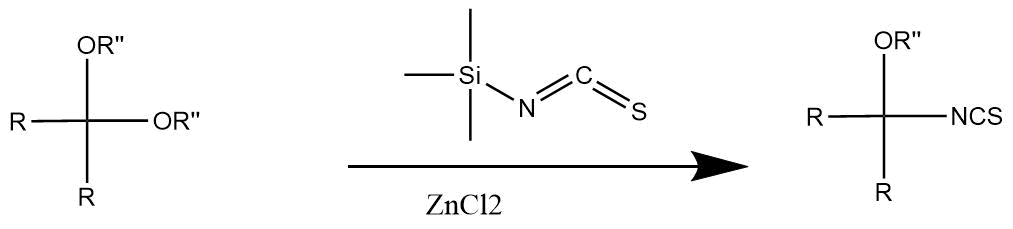

=== Mercapto-1,2,4-triazoles ===
A one-step method to prepare mercapto-1,2,4-tiazoles is favored on the industrial scale due to its high efficiency (88% yield) and non-constraining conditions: not requiring anhydrous solvent, inert gas temperature, or chromatographic purification. The method can be summarized as follows: after the equimolar mixture of benzohydrazide and TMSNCS reflux in the presence of EtOH for 5 hours, NaOH is added to the reaction mixture and the solution is refluxed for 4 h. Acetic acid is then used to cool and neutralize, ultimately yielding the pure white solid 3-phenyl-5-mercapto-4H-1,2,4-triazole at 88% yield.

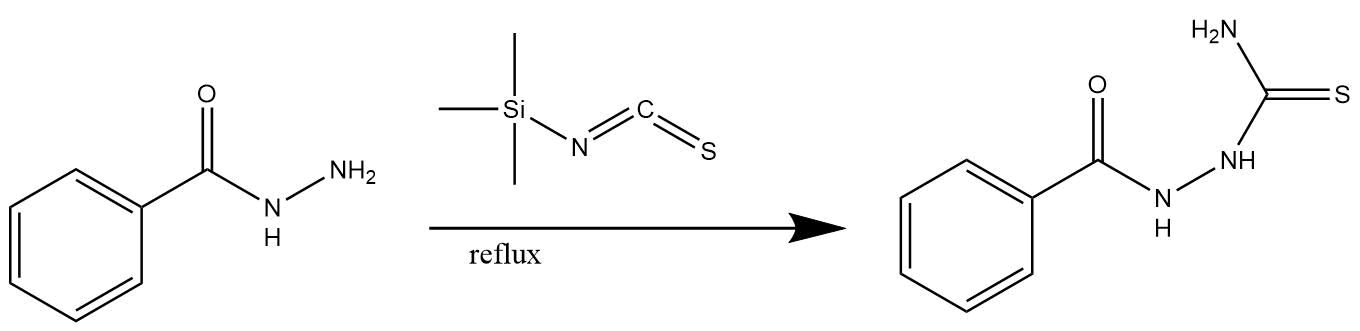

=== 2-Amino-1,3,4-oxadiazoles ===
TMSNCS used for the synthesis of 2-amino-1,3,4-oxadiazoles. The TMSNCS reagent assists in the production of the thiosemicarbazide and the subsequent reaction (cyclodesulfurization of thiosemicarbazides under basic conditions in the presence of I2/KI) results in 2-amino-1,3,4-oxadiazoles in high yields (79–94%). The 2-amino-1,3,4-oxadiazoles resulting from this reaction are: 2-Amino-5-phenyl-1,3,4-oxadiazole, 2-Amino-5-(p-methylphenyl)-1,3,4-oxadiazole, 2-Amino-5-(p-chlorophenyl)-1,3,4-oxadiazole, 2-Amino-5-(p-methoxyphenyl)- 1,3,4-oxadiazole, 2-Amino-5-(p-nitrophenyl) -1,3,4-oxadiazole, 2-Amino-5-(o-methylphenyl)-1,3,4-oxadiazole, 2-Amino-5-(o-chlorophenyl)-1,3,4-oxadiazole, ect.
