= Formyl cyanide =

Organic compound (HC(O)C≡N)

- Formyl cyanide

Names
- Preferred IUPAC name Formyl cyanide
- Systematic IUPAC name Methanoyl cyanide
- Other names Cyanoformaldehyde; Glyoxylonitrile; 2-oxo-acetonitrile oxo-acetonitrile

Identifiers
CAS Number	4471-47-0
3D model (JSmol)	Interactive image
ChemSpider	3068544
PubChem CID	3843063
CompTox Dashboard (EPA)	DTXSID0021549
- InChI: InChI=1S/C2HNO/c3-1-2-4/h2H Key: TUHMQDODLHWPCC-UHFFFAOYSA-N
- SMILES: C(=O)C#N

Properties
Chemical formula	C_{2}HNO
Molar mass	55.036 g·mol^{−1}
- Except where otherwise noted, data are given for materials in their standard state (at 25 °C [77 °F], 100 kPa). Infobox references

Formyl cyanide is a simple organic compound with the formula HCOCN and structure HC(=O)−C≡N. It is simultaneously a nitrile (R−C≡N) and an aldehyde (R−CH=O). Formyl cyanide is the simplest member of the acyl cyanide family. It is known to occur in space in the Sgr B2 molecular cloud.

== Production ==
Formyl cyanide was first made through methoxyacetonitrile flash vacuum pyrolysis at 600 °C. The same technique with cinnamyloxyacetonitrile or allyloxyacetonitrile also generates formyl cyanide.

In molecular clouds, formation of formyl cyanide is speculated to result from formaldehyde and the cyanide radical:

CH_{2}O + CN• → HCOCN + H•

In Earth's atmosphere, the pollutant acrylonitrile reacts with hydroxyl radical forming formyl cyanide, hydroperoxyl and formaldehyde:

CH_{2}=CHCN + HO• + 3/2 O_{2} → HOO• + HCOCN + CH_{2}O

== Reactions ==
Formyl cyanide reacts rapidly with trace quantities of water to form formic acid and hydrogen cyanide.

== Related ==
By formally substituting the hydrogen atom, cyanoformyl chloride, ClC(O)CN, and cyanoformyl bromide, BrC(O)CN are obtained.
