= Violuric acid =

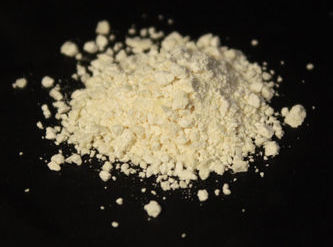

Names
- IUPAC name 6-Hydroxy-5-nitroso-1H-pyrimidine-2,4-dione
- Other names 2,4,5,6(1H,3H)-Pyrimidinetetrone 5-oxime 5-Hydroxyiminobarbituric acid 5-Isonitrosobarbituric acid Alloxan 5-oxime

Identifiers
CAS Number	87-39-8
3D model (JSmol)	Interactive image
ChemSpider	4911386
ECHA InfoCard	100.001.584
EC Number	201-741-4
PubChem CID	66599
UNII	05RFR8AC84
CompTox Dashboard (EPA)	DTXSID8058954
- InChI: InChI=1S/C4H3N3O4/c8-2-1(7-11)3(9)6-4(10)5-2/h(H3,5,6,8,9,10) Key: HRRVLSKRYVIEPR-UHFFFAOYSA-N
- SMILES: C1(=C(NC(=O)NC1=O)O)N=O

Properties
Chemical formula	C_{4}H_{3}N_{3}O_{4} (anhydrous); C_{4}H_{3}N_{3}O_{4}·H_{2}O (monohydrate)
Molar mass	157.08 g/mol (anhydrous); 175.10 g/mol (monohydrate)
Appearance	Off-white yellow or yellow cream solid
Odor	Odorless
Melting point	247 °C (477 °F; 520 K) (decomposes)
Boiling point	Decomposes
Solubility in water	0.704 g/100 mL (20 °C)
Solubility	Soluble in alcohols
Vapor pressure	~0 mmHg
Acidity (pK_{a})	4.7

Hazards
- Occupational safety and health (OHS/OSH)
Main hazards	Irritant
- GHS labelling
Pictograms	(GHS07: Exclamation mark)
Signal word	Warning
Hazard statements	H315, H319, H335
Precautionary statements	P261, P305+P351+P338

Related compounds
Related compounds	Barbituric acid
- Except where otherwise noted, data are given for materials in their standard state (at 25 °C [77 °F], 100 kPa). Infobox references

Violuric acid is an organic compound with the formula HON=C(CONH)_{2}CO. It crystallizes as white or off-white monohydrate. The compound has attracted attention because its salts are deeply colored.

== Reactions ==
It readily deprotonated to give salts of the anion [ON=C(CONH)_{2}CO]^{−}, which are often deeply colored.

== Preparation ==
It was prepared by Adolf Baeyer by reaction of barbituric acid with nitrous acid. It can also be produced by condensation of alloxan with hydroxylamine. as typical for forming the oxime of other carbonyl compounds.

== Analytical reagents ==
Structure of the ferrous complex with three violurate ligands.

Violuric acid and many of its derivatives, such as thiovioluric acid, 1,3-dimethylvioluric acid, and diphenylthiovioluric acid, have historically been used as analytical reagents for spectrophotometric determination and titration of various metals and metal-ions. It was also used as a novel staining/spraying agent for inorganic paper chromatography to identify and separate metals based on color. Most derivatives of violuric acid will also typically form brightly colored salts with most metals and nitrogen bases.

Because of the characteristic and diverse colors that violuric acid forms with alkali metals, it has been used photometrically to determine the amount of sodium in blood serum.
