= 4-Amino-1-butanol =

Organic compound and GABA analogue and precursor

Names
- Preferred IUPAC name 4-Aminobutan-1-ol
- Other names 4-Amino-1-butanol; 4-Aminobutanol; 4-Hydroxybutylamine; 4-Hydroxy-n-butylamine; N-(4-Hydroxybutyl)amine

Identifiers
CAS Number	13325-10-5
3D model (JSmol)	Interactive image
ChemSpider	24099
ECHA InfoCard	100.033.045
EC Number	236-364-4
PubChem CID	25868
CompTox Dashboard (EPA)	DTXSID70158027
- InChI: InChI=1S/C4H11NO/c5-3-1-2-4-6/h6H,1-5H2 Key: BLFRQYKZFKYQLO-UHFFFAOYSA-N
- SMILES: C(CCO)CN

Properties
Chemical formula	C_{4}H_{11}NO
Molar mass	89.138 g·mol^{−1}
Appearance	Colorless liquid
Odor	Amine-like
Density	0.967 g/ml
Melting point	16–18 °C (61–64 °F; 289–291 K)
Boiling point	206 °C (403 °F; 479 K)
Solubility in water	Soluble
Solubility	Miscible with dichloromethane

Hazards
- Occupational safety and health (OHS/OSH)
Main hazards	Severe skin burns and eye damage
- GHS labelling
Pictograms	(GHS05: Corrosive) (GHS07: Exclamation mark)
Signal word	Danger
Hazard statements	H302, H314
Precautionary statements	P260, P264, P270, P280, P301+P317, P301+P330+P331, P302+P361+P354, P304+P340, P305+P354+P338, P316, P321, P330, P363, P405, P501
Flash point	107 °C (225 °F; 380 K)
- Except where otherwise noted, data are given for materials in their standard state (at 25 °C [77 °F], 100 kPa). Infobox references

4-Amino-1-butanol, or 4-aminobutanol, also known as 4-hydroxybutylamine, is an alkanolamine and an analogue and precursor of the neurotransmitter γ-aminobutyric acid (GABA). Its formula is H_{2}NCH_{2}CH_{2}CH_{2}CH_{2}OH. It is a colorless liquid.

The structural relation of 1,4-butanediol (1,4-BD) to γ-hydroxybutyric acid (GHB) is analogous to the relation of 4-amino-1-butanol to GABA. 1,4-BD is a known prodrug of GHB which is converted into it through the actions of alcohol dehydrogenase (ADH) and aldehyde dehydrogenase (ALDH). γ-Hydroxybutyraldehyde (GHBAL) is an intermediate in this pathway, whereas the analogous intermediate structure for 4-amino-1-butanol and GABA is γ-aminobutyraldehyde (GABAL). Similar to the conversion of 1,4-BD into GHB, 4-amino-1-butanol is converted into GABAL by aldehyde reductase (ALR) and GABAL is converted into GABA by ALDH.
