= Cis-Butene-1,4-diol =

cis-Butene-1,4-diol

Names
- Preferred IUPAC name (2Z)-But-2-ene-1,4-diol

Identifiers
CAS Number	6117-80-2
3D model (JSmol)	Interactive image
ChemSpider	558888
ECHA InfoCard	100.025.532
EC Number	228-085-1
PubChem CID	643790
UNII	ZA7VGU6SCV
CompTox Dashboard (EPA)	DTXSID301018106
- InChI: InChI=1S/C4H8O2/c5-3-1-2-4-6/h1-2,5-6H,3-4H2/b2-1- Key: ORTVZLZNOYNASJ-UPHRSURJSA-N
- SMILES: C(/C=C\CO)O

Properties
Chemical formula	C_{4}H_{8}O_{2}
Molar mass	88.106 g·mol^{−1}
Density	1.07
Melting point	7 °C (45 °F; 280 K)
Boiling point	141–149 °C (286–300 °F; 414–422 K)
Solubility in water	very soluble
Solubility	ethanol, acetone

Hazards
- GHS labelling
Pictograms	(GHS07: Exclamation mark)
Signal word	Warning
Hazard statements	H302, H315, H319, H335
Precautionary statements	P261, P264, P270, P271, P280, P301+P312, P302+P352, P304+P340, P305+P351+P338, P312, P321, P330, P332+P313, P337+P313, P362, P403+P233, P405, P501
Flash point	128 °C (262 °F; 401 K)
- Except where otherwise noted, data are given for materials in their standard state (at 25 °C [77 °F], 100 kPa). Infobox references

cis-Butene-1,4-diol is a chemical compound used in the production of endosulfan. It reacts with hexachlorocyclopentadiene to form endosulfan diol. Endosulfan diol then reacts with thionyl chloride to form endosulfan.
