= Lysidine (imidazoline) =

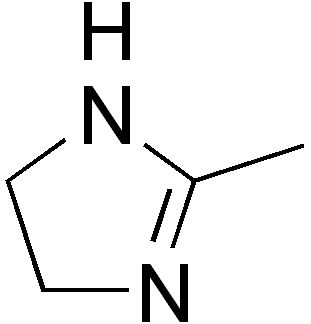

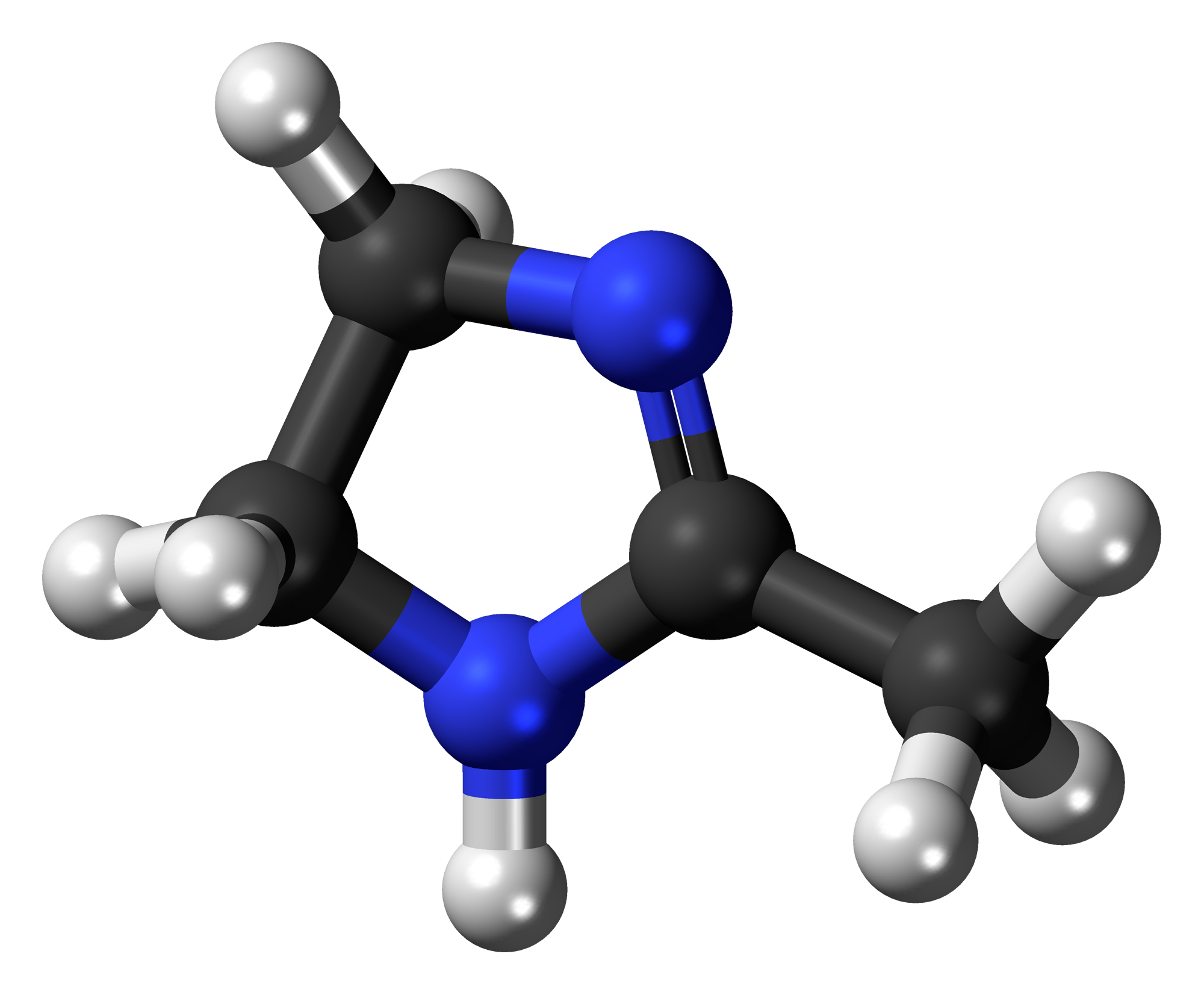

Names
- Preferred IUPAC name 2-Methyl-4,5-dihydro-1H-imidazole

Identifiers
CAS Number	534-26-9
3D model (JSmol)	Interactive image
ChemSpider	10341
ECHA InfoCard	100.007.816
EC Number	208-596-6
PubChem CID	10798
UNII	987F50E3PE
CompTox Dashboard (EPA)	DTXSID2060204
- InChI: InChI=1S/C4H8N2/c1-4-5-2-3-6-4/h2-3H2,1H3,(H,5,6) Key: VWSLLSXLURJCDF-UHFFFAOYSA-N
- SMILES: CC1=NCCN1

Properties
Chemical formula	C_{4}H_{8}N_{2}
Molar mass	84.12 g/mol
Melting point	87 °C (189 °F; 360 K) (decomposes)

Hazards
- GHS labelling
Pictograms	(GHS07: Exclamation mark)
Signal word	Warning
Hazard statements	H315, H319, H335
Precautionary statements	P261, P264, P271, P280, P302+P352, P304+P340, P305+P351+P338, P312, P321, P332+P313, P337+P313, P362, P403+P233, P405, P501
- Except where otherwise noted, data are given for materials in their standard state (at 25 °C [77 °F], 100 kPa). verify (what is ?) Infobox references

Lysidine is a derivative of 2-imidazoline. It is a colorless solid with basic properties and soluble in organic solvents. It is used as a precursor to other compounds of pharmaceutical interest.

== Synthesis and reactions ==
It is prepared by condensing ethylenediamine with acetic acid to give the diamide, which undergoes CaO-induced cyclization. Lysidine is an intermediate in the synthesis of the drug metronidazole. In the presence of Raney nickel, it undergoes dehydrogenation to 2-methylimidazole, which can then be further elaborated.

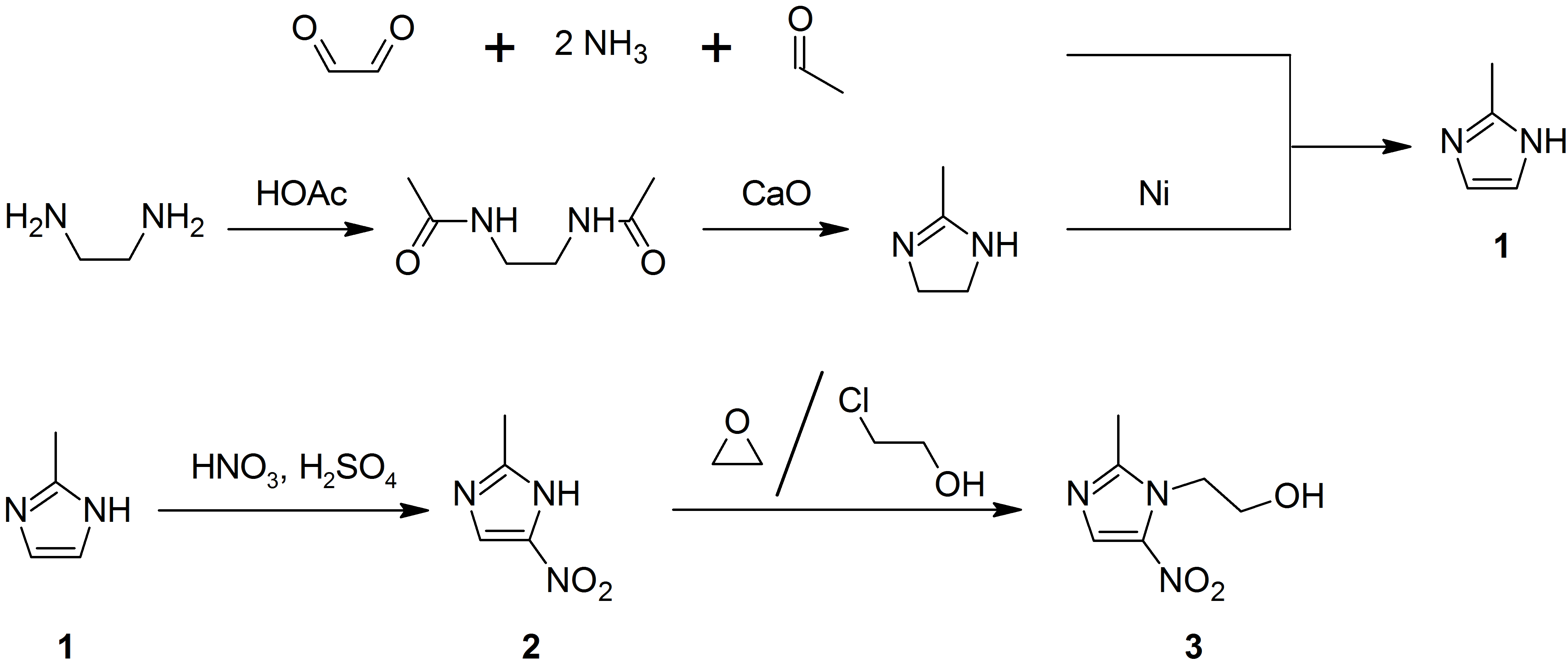
