= Maleonitrile =

Organic compound

- Skeletal formula of maleonitrile

Names
- IUPAC name (Z)-but-2-enedinitrile
- Preferred IUPAC name (2Z)-2-Butenedinitrile
- Other names: Maleonitrile; Maleinic acid dinitrile

Identifiers
CAS Number	928-53-0
3D model (JSmol)	Interactive image
ChemSpider	558876
EC Number	618-880-5
PubChem CID	643777
- InChI: InChI=1S/C4H2N2/c5-3-1-2-4-6/h1-2H/b2-1- Key: KYPOHTVBFVELTG-UPHRSURJSA-N
- SMILES: C(=C\C#N)\C#N

Properties
Chemical formula	C_{4}H_{2}N_{2}
Molar mass	78.074 g·mol^{−1}
Appearance	colorless solid
Density	1.234 g/cm^{3}
Melting point	32 °C (90 °F; 305 K)
Boiling point	110–112 °C (230–234 °F; 383–385 K) 20 torr

Hazards
Flash point	82.6 °C (180.7 °F; 355.8 K)
- Lethal dose or concentration (LD, LC)
LD_{50} (median dose)	20 mg/kg (intraperitoneal, mouse); 40 mg/kg (oral, rat)
- Except where otherwise noted, data are given for materials in their standard state (at 25 °C [77 °F], 100 kPa). Infobox references

Maleonitrile is an organic compound with the formula C_{2}H_{2}(CN)_{2}. It is a simple unsaturated dinitrile, an isomer of fumaronitrile, which has trans cyanide groups.

== Preparation and reactions ==
The compound was originally prepared by dehydration of maleamide (a derivative of maleic acid) using phosphorus pentoxide.

Maleonitrile is an electrophilic alkene and a good dienophile. It participates in metal-catalyzed alkene metathesis reactions.

== Interstellar occurrence ==
Maleonitrile was detected from interstellar cloud TMC-1 by its spectral emissions.
