= Butyl nitrate =

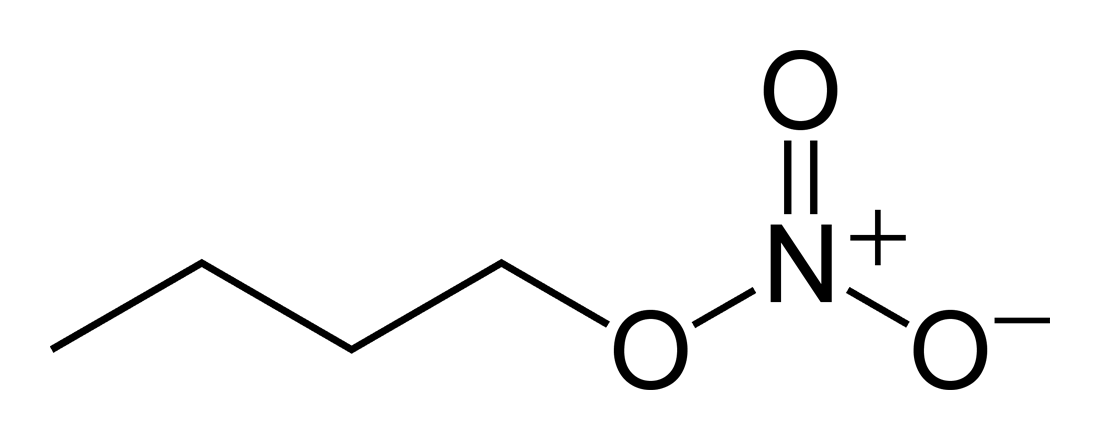

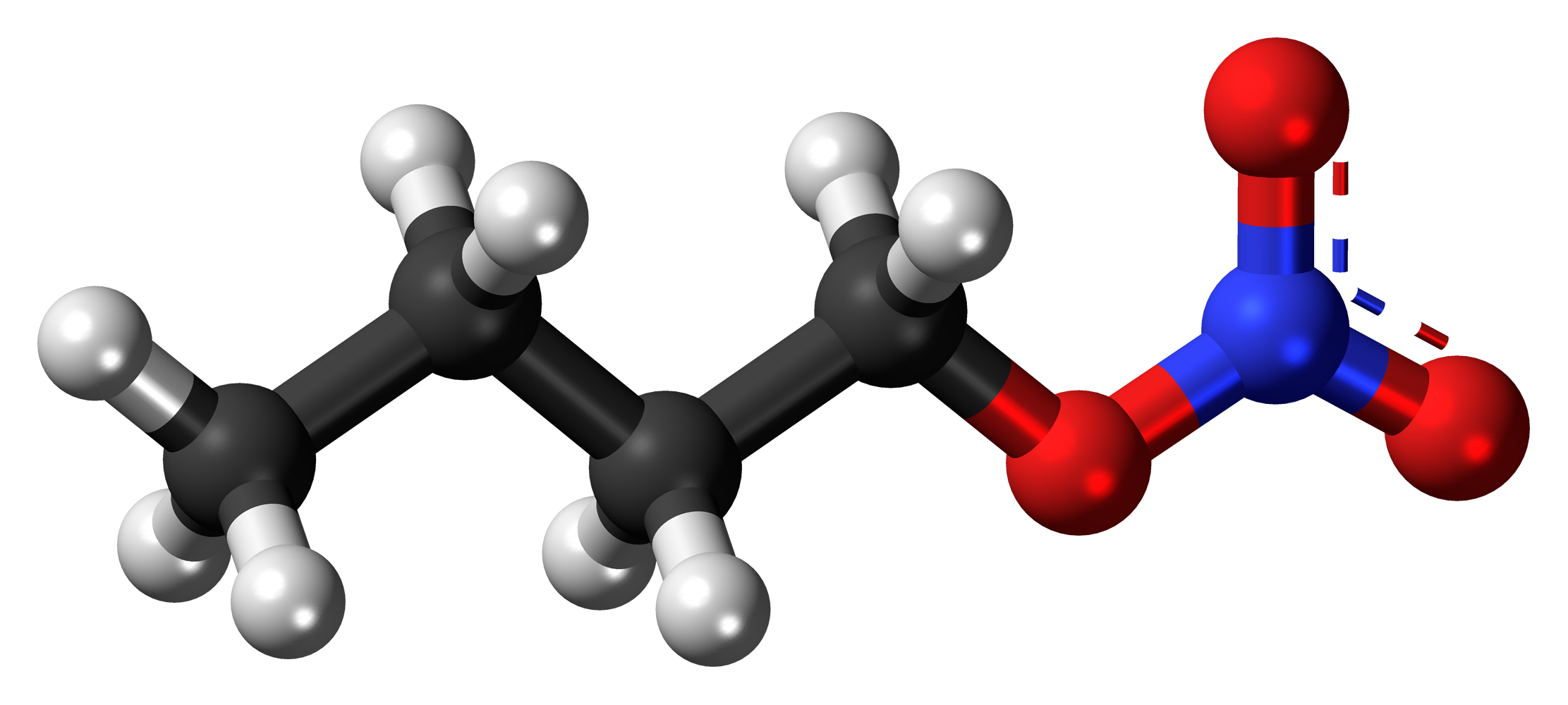

Names
- Preferred IUPAC name Butyl nitrate
- Other names Nitric acid butyl ester; 1-Nitrooxy-butane

Identifiers
CAS Number	928-45-0
3D model (JSmol)	Interactive image
ChEMBL	ChEMBL249809
ChemSpider	12978
ECHA InfoCard	100.011.976
EC Number	213-172-9
PubChem CID	13567
UNII	00YK6AM7PG
CompTox Dashboard (EPA)	DTXSID70239143
- InChI: InChI=1S/C4H9NO3/c1-2-3-4-8-5(6)7/h2-4H2,1H3 Key: QQHZPQUHCAKSOL-UHFFFAOYSA-N; InChI=1/C4H9NO3/c1-2-3-4-8-5(6)7/h2-4H2,1H3 Key: QQHZPQUHCAKSOL-UHFFFAOYAQ
- SMILES: [O-][N+](=O)OCCCC

Properties
Chemical formula	C_{4}H_{9}NO_{3}
Molar mass	119.120 g·mol^{−1}
Appearance	Colorless oil
Density	1.047 g/cm^{3}
Melting point	0 °C (32 °F; 273 K)
Boiling point	133 °C (271 °F; 406 K)
Solubility in water	1120 mg/L
Vapor pressure	9.6 mmHg

Hazards
- GHS labelling
Pictograms	(GHS02: Flammable)
Flash point	49.9 °C (121.8 °F; 323.0 K)

Related compounds
Related hydrocarbons	Cyclopentanone
Related compounds	nitric acid, butyl ester
- Except where otherwise noted, data are given for materials in their standard state (at 25 °C [77 °F], 100 kPa). verify (what is ?) Infobox references

Butyl nitrate is a colorless oil. It is often confused with butyl nitrite, which is sometimes used as a recreational inhalant.

== Safety ==
Butyl nitrate is an explosive. It reacts explosively with Lewis acids such as boron trifluoride and aluminium chloride. When heated to decomposition, it emits fumes of nitrous oxide.
