= Fumaronitrile =

Names
- Other names (2E)-2-Butenedinitrile

Identifiers
CAS Number	764-42-1
3D model (JSmol)	Interactive image
ChEMBL	ChEMBL1451833
ChemSpider	553503
ECHA InfoCard	100.011.020
EC Number	212-122-3
PubChem CID	637930
UN number	3439
CompTox Dashboard (EPA)	DTXSID7025342
- InChI: InChI=1S/C4H2N2/c5-3-1-2-4-6/h1-2H/b2-1+ Key: KYPOHTVBFVELTG-OWOJBTEDSA-N
- SMILES: C(=C/C#N)\C#N

Properties
Chemical formula	C_{4}H_{2}N_{2}
Molar mass	78.074 g·mol^{−1}
Appearance	white solid
Density	1.249 g/cm^{3}
Melting point	96.8 °C (206.2 °F; 369.9 K)
Boiling point	48 °C (118 °F; 321 K) 4 torr

Hazards
- GHS labelling
Pictograms	(GHS06: Toxic)
Signal word	Danger
Hazard statements	H301, H331
Precautionary statements	P261, P264, P270, P271, P301+P316, P304+P340, P316, P321, P330, P403+P233, P405, P501
- Except where otherwise noted, data are given for materials in their standard state (at 25 °C [77 °F], 100 kPa). Infobox references

Fumaronitrile is an organic compound with the formula C_{2}H_{2}(CN)_{2}. It is a simple unsaturated dinitrile, an isomer of maleonitrile, which has cis cyanide groups.

== Preparation and reactions ==
The compound was originally prepared by dehydration of the diamide of fumaric acid using phosphorus pentoxide.

Fumaronitrile is an electrophilic alkene. It is a good dienophile. It participates in metal-catalyzed alkene metathesis reactions.
