= Mucobromic acid =

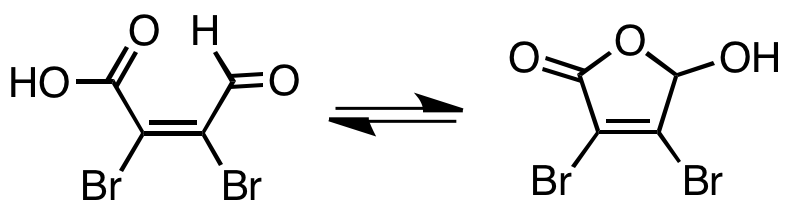

Names
- IUPAC name 2,3-dibromo-4-oxobut-2-enoic acid 3,4-dibromo-5-hydroxy-2,5-dihydrofuran-2-one
- Systematic IUPAC name (2Z)-2,3-Dibromo-4-oxo-2-butenoic acid/(±)-3,4-dibromo-5-hydroxy-2(5H)-furanone (1:1)
- Other names 2,3-Dibromomalealdehydic acid Dibromomalealdehydic acid Dibromoaldehydoacrylic acid

Identifiers
CAS Number	488-11-9; 3,4-Dibromo-5-hydroxyfuran-2(5H)-one: 766-38-1
3D model (JSmol)	Interactive image; 3,4-Dibromo-5-hydroxyfuran-2(5H)-one: Interactive image
ChemSpider	22236714
ECHA InfoCard	100.006.973
EC Number	207-670-5; 3,4-Dibromo-5-hydroxyfuran-2(5H)-one: 212-164-2
PubChem CID	68100; 3,4-Dibromo-5-hydroxyfuran-2(5H)-one: 93559
CompTox Dashboard (EPA)	DTXSID20883397
- InChI: InChI=1S/C4H2Br2O3/c5-2(1-7)3(6)4(8)9/h1H,(H,8,9) Key: NCNYEGJDGNOYJX-UHFFFAOYSA-N; InChI=1S/2C4H2Br2O3/c5-1-2(6)4(8)9-3(1)7;5-2(1-7)3(6)4(8)9/h3,7H;1H,(H,8,9)/b;3-2+; 3,4-Dibromo-5-hydroxyfuran-2(5H)-one: InChI=1S/C4H2Br2O3/c5-1-2(6)4(8)9-3(1)7/h3,7H Key: PKDBSOOYVOEUQR-UHFFFAOYSA-N
- SMILES: C(=O)C(=C(C(=O)O)Br)Br; 3,4-Dibromo-5-hydroxyfuran-2(5H)-one: C1(O)C(Br)=C(Br)C(=O)O1

Properties
Chemical formula	C_{4}H_{2}Br_{2}O_{3}
Molar mass	257.865 g·mol^{−1}
Appearance	white solid
Melting point	122 to 124 °C (252 to 255 °F; 395 to 397 K)
Boiling point	619.7 °C (1,147.5 °F; 892.9 K)
Solubility in methanol	0.1 g/mL
Vapor pressure	5.96^{−18} mmHg

Hazards
- Occupational safety and health (OHS/OSH)
Main hazards	burns skin and eyes
- GHS labelling
Pictograms	(GHS05: Corrosive)
Signal word	Danger
Hazard statements	H314
Precautionary statements	P280, P305+P351+P338, P310
Flash point	328.6 °C (623.5 °F; 601.8 K)
Safety data sheet (SDS)	MSDS
- Except where otherwise noted, data are given for materials in their standard state (at 25 °C [77 °F], 100 kPa). Infobox references

Mucobromic acid is an organic compound that consists of a dibrominated alkene with aldehyde and carboxylic acid functional groups. It easily tautomerizes to a furanone hemiacetal form. This compound, and the analogous mucochloric acid, form the group of known mucohalic acids. The bromide appears to behave similarly to the more heavily studied chloride.

== Synthesis and structure ==
Mucobromic acid can be synthesized by bromination of furfural via an oxidation/decarboxylation process:

C_{4}H_{3}OCHO + 5 Br_{2} + 3 H_{2}O → C_{2}Br_{2}CHO(CO_{2}H) + CO_{2} + 8 HBr

Mucobromic acid exists as a mixture acyclic and cyclic isomers. The compound can be reduced using sodium borohydride to give the lactone.

Hydrolysis under basic conditions of either the chloro or bromo compound involves substitution of the halide adjacent to the acid. The resulting mucoxyhalic acids exist as a mixture of keto and enol forms. The reaction occurs via a conjugate addition/elimination of the alkene–aldehyde part of the structure.

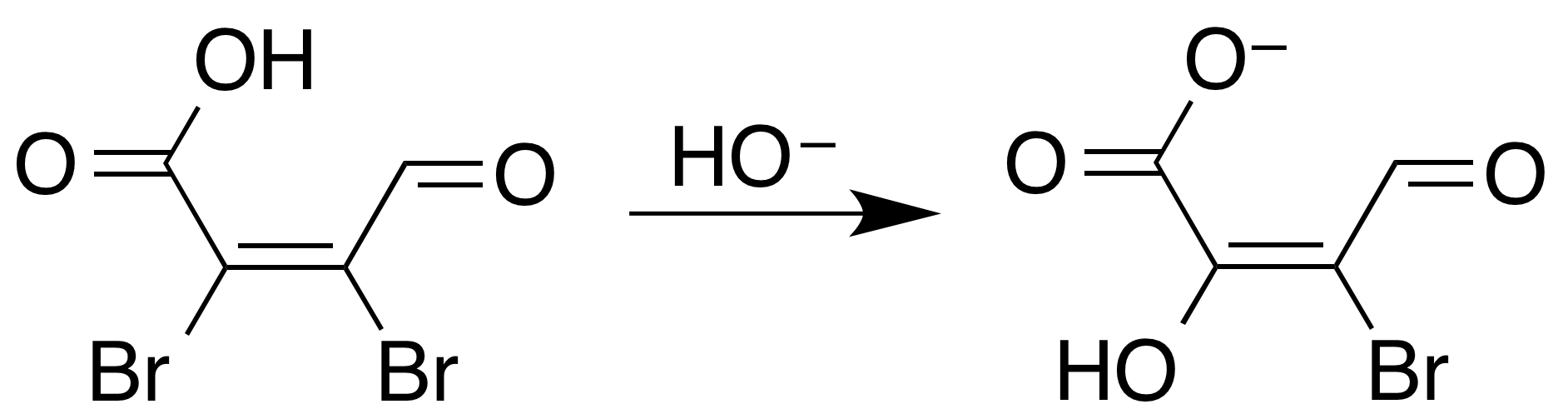

== Hazards ==
Mucohalic acids have received attention since they are products of the halogenation of biomass. They are genotoxins and potential carcinogens. They have the ability to alkylate certain DNA bases, specifically guanosine, adenosine, and cytosine.
