= Oxalyl dicyanide =

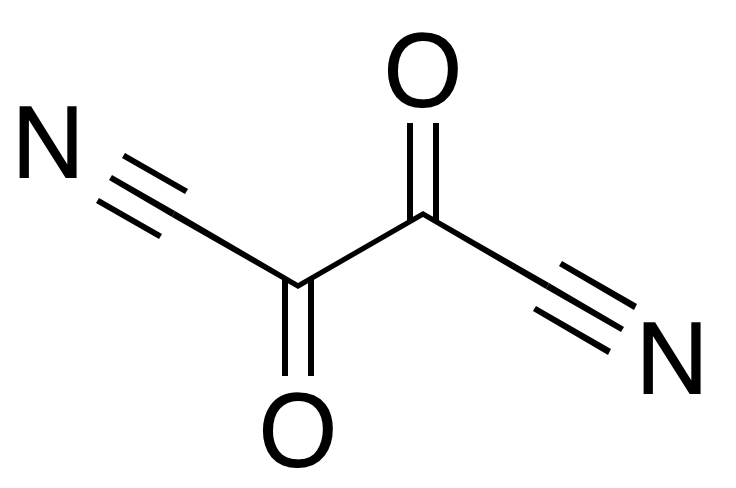

Names
- Preferred IUPAC name Oxalyl dicyanide
- Systematic IUPAC name Ethanedioyl dicyanide
- Other names Oxalyl cyanide Ethanedioyl cyanide Dioxosuccinonitrile; 2,3-Doxosuccinonitrile; Dioxobutanedinitrile

Identifiers
CAS Number	36086-83-6
3D model (JSmol)	Interactive image
ChemSpider	21409242
PubChem CID	24974570
CompTox Dashboard (EPA)	DTXSID90648218
- InChI: InChI=1S/C4N2O2/c5-1-3(7)4(8)2-6 Key: VKZZALQGAUWTLQ-UHFFFAOYSA-N
- SMILES: N#CC(=O)C(=O)C#N

Properties
Chemical formula	C_{4}N_{2}O_{2}
Molar mass	108.05 g/mol
- Except where otherwise noted, data are given for materials in their standard state (at 25 °C [77 °F], 100 kPa). Infobox references

Oxalyl dicyanide is a chemical compound with the formula C_{4}N_{2}O_{2}.

== Formation ==
Oxalyl dicyanide can be formed by the hydrolysis of diiminosuccinonitrile.

== Reactions ==
Oxalyl dicyanide can condense with diaminomaleonitrile to make pyrazinetetracarbonitrile and also 5,6-dihydroxypyrazine-2,3-dicarbonitrile, both derivatives of pyrazine.

== See also ==
- Cyanogen
