= 3-Bromothiophene =

Names
- Preferred IUPAC name 3-Bromothiophene
- Other names 3-Thienyl bromide, 3BT

Identifiers
CAS Number	872-31-1
3D model (JSmol)	Interactive image
ChemSpider	12811
ECHA InfoCard	100.011.656
EC Number	212-821-3
PubChem CID	13383
UNII	G818Z74YV0
CompTox Dashboard (EPA)	DTXSID2022129
- InChI: InChI=1S/C4H3BrS/c5-4-1-2-6-3-4/h1-3H Key: XCMISAPCWHTVNG-UHFFFAOYSA-N; InChI=1/C4H3BrS/c5-4-1-2-6-3-4/h1-3H Key: XCMISAPCWHTVNG-UHFFFAOYAH
- SMILES: C1=CSC=C1Br

Properties
Chemical formula	C_{4}H_{3}BrS
Molar mass	163.03 g·mol^{−1}
Appearance	Colorless liquid
Density	1.74 g/mL
Melting point	−10 °C (14 °F; 263 K)
Boiling point	150–158 °C (302–316 °F; 423–431 K)
Solubility in water	Immiscible

Hazards
- Occupational safety and health (OHS/OSH)
Main hazards	N,Xi,Xn,T
- GHS labelling
Pictograms	(GHS02: Flammable) (GHS06: Toxic) (GHS07: Exclamation mark) (GHS09: Environmental hazard)
Signal word	Danger
Hazard statements	H226, H301, H310, H315, H317, H319, H330, H335, H411
Precautionary statements	P210, P233, P240, P241, P242, P243, P260, P262, P264, P270, P271, P272, P273, P280, P284, P301+P310, P302+P350, P302+P352, P303+P361+P353, P304+P340, P305+P351+P338, P310, P312, P320, P321, P330, P332+P313, P333+P313, P337+P313, P361, P362, P363, P370+P378, P391, P403+P233, P403+P235, P405, P501
Flash point	56 °C (133 °F; 329 K)
- Except where otherwise noted, data are given for materials in their standard state (at 25 °C [77 °F], 100 kPa). Infobox references

3-Bromothiophene is an organosulfur compound with the formula C_{4}H_{3}BrS. It is a colorless liquid. It is a precursor to the antibiotic timentin and the vasodilator cetiedil.

== Preparation ==
Unlike 2-bromothiophene, the 3-bromo isomer cannot be prepared directly from thiophene. It can be prepared by debromination of 2,3,5-tribromothiophene, which is obtained by bromination of thiophene.

Synthese van 3-broomthiofeen

== See also ==
- 2-Bromothiophene
