= 2-Bromothiophene =

Names
- Preferred IUPAC name 2-Bromothiophene
- Other names 2-Thienyl bromide, 2BT

Identifiers
| CAS Number | 1003-09-4 |
| 3D model (JSmol) | Interactive image |
| ChemSpider | 13251 |
| ECHA InfoCard | 100.012.454 |
| EC Number | 213-699-4 |
| PubChem CID | 13851 |
| UNII | GFF929NUW7 |
| CompTox Dashboard (EPA) | DTXSID4061389 |
- InChI: InChI=1S/C4H3BrS/c5-4-2-1-3-6-4/h1-3H Key: TUCRZHGAIRVWTI-UHFFFAOYSA-N
- SMILES: C1=CSC(=C1)Br

Properties
| Chemical formula | C_{4}H_{3}BrS |
| Molar mass | 163.03 g·mol^{−1} |
| Appearance | Colorless liquid |
| Density | 1.684 g/mL |
| Melting point | −10 °C (14 °F; 263 K) |
| Boiling point | 153.5 °C (308.3 °F; 426.6 K) |
| Solubility in water | Immiscible |

Hazards
- Occupational safety and health (OHS/OSH)
| Main hazards | N,Xi,Xn,T |
- GHS labelling
| Pictograms | (GHS02: Flammable) (GHS05: Corrosive) (GHS06: Toxic) (GHS07: Exclamation mark) |
| Signal word | Danger |
| Hazard statements | H226, H300, H301, H310, H315, H318, H319, H330 |
| Precautionary statements | P210, P233, P240, P241, P242, P243, P260, P262, P264, P270, P271, P280, P284, P301+P310, P302+P350, P302+P352, P303+P361+P353, P304+P340, P305+P351+P338, P310, P320, P321, P330, P332+P313, P337+P313, P361, P362, P363, P370+P378, P403+P233, P403+P235, P405, P501 |
| Flash point | 56 °C (133 °F; 329 K) |
- Except where otherwise noted, data are given for materials in their standard state (at 25 °C [77 °F], 100 kPa). Infobox references

2-Bromothiophene is an organosulfur compound with the formula C_{4}H_{3}BrS. It is a colorless liquid. Unlike 3-bromothiophene, the 2-bromo isomer is prepared directly by partial bromination of thiophene. It is a precursor to several drugs, including tipepidine, ticlopidine, and clopidogrel.

== Safety ==
The LD_{50} is low, 200–250 mg/kg (oral, rat).
