= Mucochloric acid =

Names
- IUPAC name (2Z)-2,3-Dichloro-4-oxobut-2-enoic acid
- Other names: 2,3-Dichloromalealdehydic acid; α,β-Dichloro-β-formylacrylic acid

Identifiers
CAS Number	87-56-9
3D model (JSmol)	Interactive image
ChEMBL	ChEMBL1879926
ChemSpider	2052308
ECHA InfoCard	100.001.594
EC Number	201-752-4
PubChem CID	2771871
UNII	5I5877JHIW
CompTox Dashboard (EPA)	DTXSID7020423
- InChI: InChI=1/C4H2Cl2O3/c5-2(1-7)3(6)4(8)9/h1H,(H,8,9)/b3-2- Key: LUMLZKVIXLWTCI-IHWYPQMZSA-N
- SMILES: O=CC(Cl)=C(Cl)C(O)=O

Properties
Chemical formula	C_{4}H_{2}Cl_{2}O_{3}
Molar mass	168.96 g·mol^{−1}
Melting point	124–128 °C (255–262 °F; 397–401 K)

Hazards
- Occupational safety and health (OHS/OSH)
Main hazards	Corrosive, toxic
- GHS labelling
Pictograms	(GHS05: Corrosive) (GHS06: Toxic) (GHS07: Exclamation mark) (GHS08: Health hazard)
Signal word	Danger
Hazard statements	H301, H314, H317, H341, H412
Precautionary statements	P203, P260, P264, P264+P265, P270, P272, P273, P280, P301+P316, P301+P330+P331, P302+P352, P302+P361+P354, P304+P340, P305+P354+P338, P316, P317, P318, P321, P330, P333+P317, P362+P364, P363, P405, P501
- Except where otherwise noted, data are given for materials in their standard state (at 25 °C [77 °F], 100 kPa). Infobox references

Mucochloric acid is an organic compound with the formula C_{4}H_{2}Cl_{2}O_{3}. It consists of a dichlorinated alkene bearing aldehyde and carboxylic acid functional groups. It is the chlorinated analog of mucobromic acid and one of the known mucohalic acids. Mucochloric acid exists in equilibrium between open-chain and cyclic (furanone hemiacetal) forms, analogous to mucobromic acid. Mucochloric acid occurs as a chlorine disinfection byproduct in drinking water.

== Synthesis ==
Mucochloric acid can be prepared by chlorination of furfural or related compounds such as furoic acid.

== Applications ==
Due to its reactive chlorine atoms, double bond, and carbonyl groups, mucochloric acid serves as a versatile intermediate in organic synthesis, including for substituted furanones and other heterocycles.

== Safety ==
Mucochloric acid is corrosive and toxic. It exhibits mutagenic and genotoxic activity.
