= List of compounds with carbon number 21 =

This is a partial list of molecules that contain 21 carbon atoms.

Chemical formula	Synonyms	CAS number
C_{21}H_{15}N	triphenylacrylonitrile	6304-33-2
C_{21}H_{16}	triphenylcyclopropene	16510-49-9
C_{21}H_{18}N_{2}	hydrobenzamide	92-29-5
C_{21}H_{18}NO_{4}	chelerythrine	34316-15-9
C_{21}H_{18}O_{11}	Baicalin	21967-41-9
C_{21}H_{18}O_{12}	Several molecules	27740-01-8
C_{21}H_{20}Cl_{2}O_{3}	permethrin	52645-53-1
C_{21}H_{20}O_{6}	curcumin	458-37-7
C_{21}H_{20}O_{9}	Several molecules	-
C_{21}H_{20}O_{10}	Several molecules	-
C_{21}H_{20}O_{11}	Several molecules	-
C_{21}H_{20}O_{12}	Several molecules	-
C_{21}H_{21}N	cyproheptadine	129-03-3
C_{21}H_{21}NO_{6}	hydrastine	118-08-1
C_{21}H_{21}N_{3}O_{7}	cacotheline	561-20-6
C_{21}H_{21}O_{4}P	tricresyl phosphate	78-30-8
C_{21}H_{21}O_{4}P	tricresyl phosphate	73299-28-2
C_{21}H_{21}O_{11}	Several molecules	7084-24-4
C_{21}H_{21}O_{12}	Myrtillin	6906-38-3
C_{21}H_{22}	methyldodecahedrane	82400-17-7
C_{21}H_{22}N_{2}O_{2}	strychnine	57-24-9
C_{21}H_{22}O_{8}	Nobiletin	478-01-3
C_{21}H_{22}O_{9}	Several molecules	-
C_{21}H_{22}O_{11}	Several molecules	-
C_{21}H_{22}O_{12}	Several molecules	-
C_{21}H_{23}ClFNO_{2}	haloperidol	52-86-8
C_{21}H_{23}ClFN_{3}O	flurazepam	17617-23-1
C_{21}H_{23}NO	dapoxetine	119356-77-3
C_{21}H_{23}NO_{6}	colchiceine	102491-69-0
C_{21}H_{23}N_{3}OS	pericyazine	2622-26-6
C_{21}H_{24}ClNO_{5}	morclofone	31848-01-8
C_{21}H_{24}ClN_{3}OS	pipamazine	84-04-8
C_{21}H_{24}ClN_{3}O_{3}	fominoben	18053-31-1
C_{21}H_{24}F_{3}N_{3}S	trifluoperazine	117-89-5
C_{21}H_{24}GeSn	trimethylgermanyltriphenyltin	20213-95-0
C_{21}H_{24}N_{2}O_{3}	ajmalicine	483-04-5
C_{21}H_{25}NO	benztropine	86-13-5
C_{21}H_{25}NO	octyloxycyanobiphenyl	52364-73-5
C_{21}H_{25}NO_{2}	piperidolate	82-98-4
C_{21}H_{25}NO_{3}	piperilate	4546-39-8
C_{21}H_{26}ClNO	clemastine	15686-51-8
C_{21}H_{26}ClN_{3}OS	perphenazine	58-39-9
C_{21}H_{26}N_{2}O	acetyl fentanyl	3258-84-2
C_{21}H_{26}N_{2}OS_{2}	mesoridazine	5588-33-0
C_{21}H_{26}N_{2}O_{2}S_{2}	sulforidazine	14759-06-9
C_{21}H_{26}N_{2}O_{3}	epivincamine	6835-99-0
C_{21}H_{26}N_{2}O_{3}	vincamine	1617-90-9
C_{21}H_{26}N_{2}O_{3}	yohimbine	146-48-5
C_{21}H_{26}O_{2}	cannabinol	521-35-7
C_{21}H_{26}O_{2}	mestranol	72-33-3
C_{21}H_{26}O_{3}	octabenzone	1843-05-6
C_{21}H_{26}O_{5}	prednisone	53-03-2
C_{21}H_{27}ClN_{2}O_{2}	hydroxyzine base	68-88-2
C_{21}H_{27}NO	diphenidol	972-02-1
C_{21}H_{27}NO	quinolinimide	466-40-0
C_{21}H_{27}NO_{2}	etafenone	90-54-0
C_{21}H_{27}NO_{2}	norpropoxyphene	66796-40-5
C_{21}H_{27}NO_{4}	laudanosine	20412-65-1
C_{21}H_{27}NO_{4}S	diphemanil metilsulfate	62-97-5
C_{21}H_{27}N_{3}O_{2}	methysergide	361-37-5
C_{21}H_{28}NO_{7}	clivorine	33979-15-6
C_{21}H_{28}N_{2}O	diampromide	552-25-0
C_{21}H_{28}N_{2}O_{5}	trimethobenzamide	138-56-7
C_{21}H_{28}O_{2}	ethisterone	434-03-7
C_{21}H_{28}O_{2}	ethisterone	17554-63-1
C_{21}H_{28}O_{5}	aldosterone	52-39-1
C_{21}H_{28}O_{5}	cortisone	53-06-5
C_{21}H_{28}BrNO_{4}	cimetropium bromide	51598-60-8
C_{21}H_{29}NO	alphamethadol	17199-54-1
C_{21}H_{29}NO	biperiden	514-65-8
C_{21}H_{29}NO_{7}	neoligularidine	90364-91-3
C_{21}H_{29}NO_{8}	florosenine	16958-30-8
C_{21}H_{29}NS_{2}	captodiame	486-17-9
C_{21}H_{29}N_{3}O	disopyramide	3737-09-5
C_{21}H_{30}ClNO_{8}	doronine	60367-00-2
C_{21}H_{30}CrO_{3}	hexaethylbenzenechromium tricarbonyl	47378-46-1
C_{21}H_{30}FN_{3}O_{2}	pipamperone	1893-33-0
C_{21}H_{30}O_{2}	cannabidiol	521-37-9
C_{21}H_{30}O_{2}	progesterone	57-83-0
C_{21}H_{30}O_{2}	tetrahydrocannabinol	56282-24-7
C_{21}H_{30}O_{3}	deoxycorticosterone	64-85-7
C_{21}H_{30}O_{5}	hydrocortisone	50-23-7
C_{21}H_{31}ClN_{2}O	viminol	21363-18-8
C_{21}H_{31}NO_{2}	bornaprine	20448-86-6
C_{21}H_{31}NO_{4}	furethidine	2385-81-1
C_{21}H_{32}N_{2}O	stanozolol	10418-03-8
C_{21}H_{32}O_{2}	bolasterone	1605-89-6
C_{21}H_{32}O_{2}	calusterone	17021-26-0
C_{21}H_{32}O_{2}	hexahydrocannabinol	6692-85-9
C_{21}H_{32}O_{2}	methyl isopimarate	1686-62-0
C_{21}H_{32}O_{2}	methyl levopimarate	3513-69-7
C_{21}H_{32}O_{2}	methyl neoabietate	3310-97-2
C_{21}H_{32}O_{2}	methyl pimarate	3730-56-1
C_{21}H_{32}O_{2}	methyl sandaracopimarate	1686-54-0
C_{21}H_{32}O_{3}	androsterone acetate	1482-78-6
C_{21}H_{32}O_{3}	oxymetholone	434-07-1
C_{21}H_{32}O_{4}	decyl benzyl succinate	119450-18-9
C_{21}H_{36}O_{5}	cortol	516-38-1
C_{21}H_{38}ClN	cetylpyridinium chloride	123-03-5
C_{21}H_{38}BrN	benzododecinium bromide	7281-04-1
C_{21}H_{38}O_{2}	isopropyl linoleate	22882-95-7
C_{21}H_{38}O_{6}	tricaproin	621-70-5
C_{21}H_{39}NO_{2}Si_{2}	phenylalanine ditbdms	107715-95-7
C_{21}H_{40}	4-nonylbicyclohexyl	95135-87-8
C_{21}H_{40}O_{2}	octadecyl acrylate	4813-57-4
C_{21}H_{40}O_{4}	mono olein	111-03-5
C_{21}H_{40}O_{5}	glyceryl monoricinoleate	1323-38-2
C_{21}H_{41}N	henicosanenitrile	66326-13-4
C_{21}H_{42}	cycloheneicosane	296-78-6
C_{21}H_{42}O_{2}	eicosyl methanoate	66326-15-6
C_{21}H_{42}O_{2}	ethyl nonadecanoate	18281-04-4
C_{21}H_{42}O_{2}	heneicosanoic acid	2363-71-5
C_{21}H_{42}O_{2}	isopropyl stearate	112-10-7
C_{21}H_{44}BrNO_{2}	Carbethopendecinium bromide	10567-02-9
C_{21}H_{46}N_{2}	duomeen o	4253-76-3
C_{21}H_{46}O_{3}Si	octadecyltrimethoxysilane	3069-42-9
C_{21}H_{49}NO_{2}SSi_{3}	cystein tritbdms	110024-94-7
C_{21}H_{50}O_{3}Si_{3}	glycerol tritbdms	82112-23-0

== See also ==
- Carbon number
- List of compounds with carbon number 20
- List of compounds with carbon number 22
