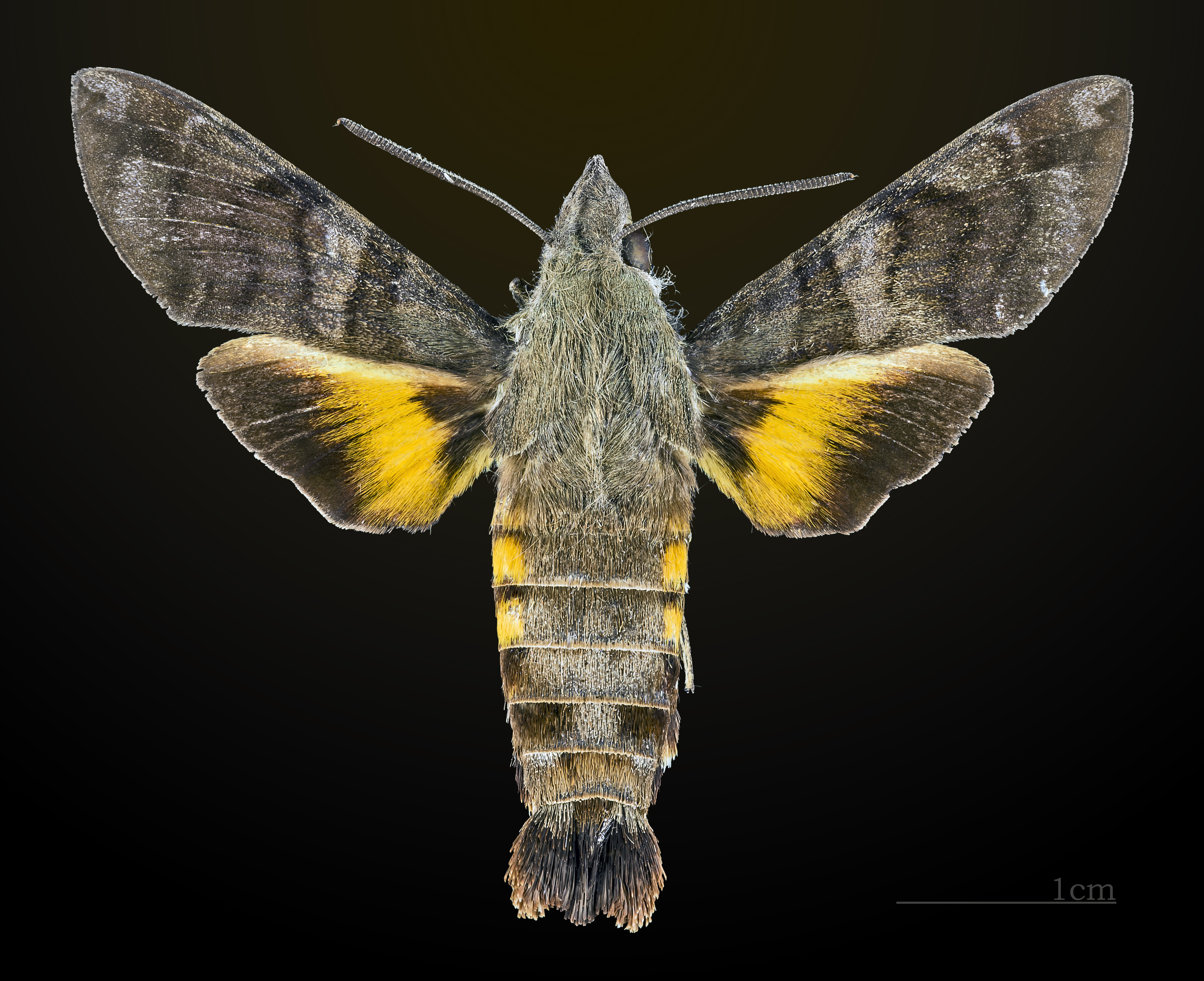
- Dorsal view - MHNT
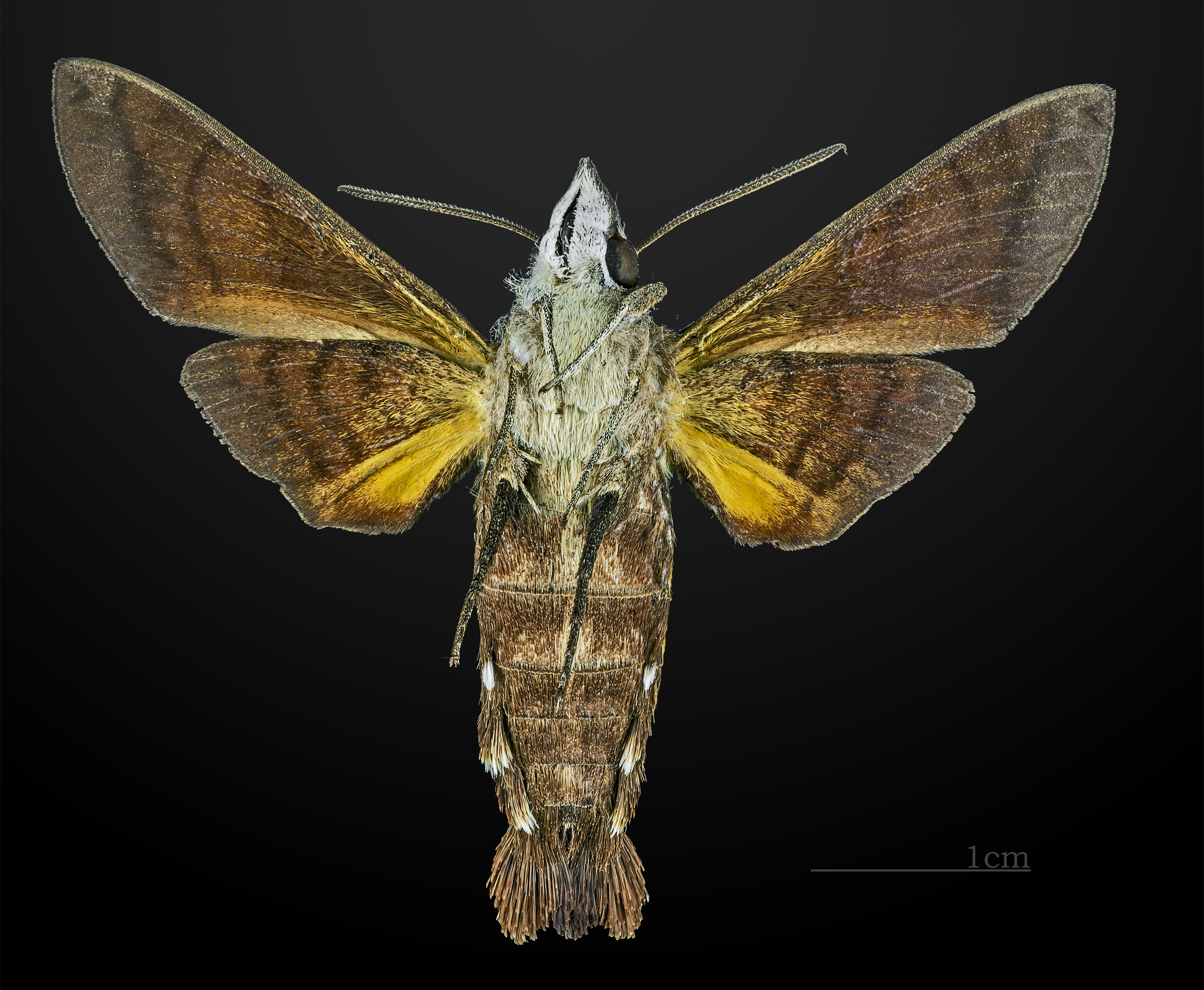
- Ventral view - MHNT

Scientific classification
- Kingdom: Animalia
- Phylum: Arthropoda
- Class: Insecta
- Order: Lepidoptera
- Family: Sphingidae
- Genus: Macroglossum
- Species: M. belis

Binomial name
- Macroglossum belis (Linnaeus, 1758)

Synonyms
- Sphinx belis Linnaeus, 1758; Macroglossa pyrrhula Boisduval, 1875; Macroglossa opis Boisduval, 1875

= Macroglossum belis =

Common hummingbird hawkmoth

Species of moth

Macroglossum belis, the common hummingbird hawkmoth, is a moth of the family Sphingidae. It was described by Carl Linnaeus in his 1758 10th edition of Systema Naturae. It is known from Sri Lanka, India, Nepal, Thailand, southern China, Taiwan, Japan (Ryukyu Archipelago), Vietnam and Indonesia (Java).

== Description ==
The wingspan is 50–60 mm. Adults are attracted to the flowers of Duranta erecta and Lantana camara at dawn and dusk. The adult differs from Macroglossum affictitia in the head, thorax, abdomen and forewings being redder brown, the two lines forming the antemedial band of the forewing not filled in with black. The postmedial lines not so parallel, the second line being nearer the first at the costa, the third at inner margin. The patch near the apex reddish brown with no dark streak below it. Hindwings with reddish-yellow band.

Larva is black. The head red, a white subdorsal line and the sides spotted and streaked with red and yellow. Larvae have been recorded feeding on Strychnos angustiflora in Hong Kong and on Strychnos nux-vomica, Saprosoma indicum and Spermadictyon suaveolans in India.
