= Durantin A =

Names
- Preferred IUPAC name [(2R,3R)-3-(4-Hydroxy-3-methoxyphenyl)-5-methoxy-9-oxo-2,3-dihydro-9H-pyrano[2,3-f][1,4]benzodioxin-2-yl]methyl acetate

Identifiers
3D model (JSmol)	Interactive image
ChEMBL	ChEMBL495830
ChemSpider	9399162
PubChem CID	11224109
CompTox Dashboard (EPA)	DTXSID401045489
- InChI: InChI=1S/C22H20O9/c1-11(23)28-10-17-19(12-4-6-14(24)15(8-12)26-2)31-21-16(27-3)9-13-5-7-18(25)30-20(13)22(21)29-17/h4-9,17,19,24H,10H2,1-3H3/t17-,19-/m1/s1 Key: ICLAWMWLMZMRGC-IEBWSBKVSA-N; InChI=1/C22H20O9/c1-11(23)28-10-17-19(12-4-6-14(24)15(8-12)26-2)31-21-16(27-3)9-13-5-7-18(25)30-20(13)22(21)29-17/h4-9,17,19,24H,10H2,1-3H3/t17-,19-/m1/s1 Key: ICLAWMWLMZMRGC-IEBWSBKVBP
- SMILES: CC(=O)OC[C@@H]1[C@H](OC2=C(C=C3C=CC(=O)OC3=C2O1)OC)C4=CC(=C(C=C4)O)OC

Properties
Chemical formula	C_{22}H_{20}O_{9}
Molar mass	428.393 g·mol^{−1}
- Except where otherwise noted, data are given for materials in their standard state (at 25 °C [77 °F], 100 kPa). Infobox references

Durantin A is a bio-active coumarinolignoid isolated from the flowering plant Duranta repens.
