= Skyflower =

Skyflower is a common name for several plants and may refer to:

- Duranta erecta, a shurb or small tree native to Central and South America, and widely cultivated and naturalized
- Hydrolea corymbosa, an herb or subshrub endemic to the southeastern United States
