= C21H20O10 =

The molecular formula C_{21}H_{20}O_{10} (molar mass: 432.38 g/mol, exact mass: 432.105647 u) may refer to:

- 3'-Hydroxy-3,5,8,4',5'-pentamethoxy-6,7-methylenedioxyflavone (CAS number 82668-94-8)
- 1-O-beta-D-glucopyranosyl emodin (CAS number 38840-23-2)
- 5,7,8-Trihydroxyflavone 5-glucoside (CAS number 151261-87-9)
- 5,7,8-Trihydroxyflavone 7-galactoside (CAS number 824951-93-1)
- 6-C-Chinovopyranosylluteolin (CAS number 132368-05-9)
- 6-C-Fucopyranosylluteolin (CAS number 132368-06-0)
- 7,2',4'-Trihydroxyisoflavone 4'-O-glucoside
- 7,3',4'-Trihydroxyflavone 7-glucoside (CAS number 24502-03-2)
- 7,3',4',5'-Tetrahydroxyflavone 7-rhamnoside (CAS number 98411-71-3)
- 8-C-beta-D-Galactopyranosylapigenin (CAS number 35013-07-1)
- 8-C-Glucosyl-5-deoxykaempferol (CAS number 108351-24-2)
- 8-C-Rhamnopyranosylluteolin
- Afzelin, a flavonol rhamnoside
- Apigenin 5-O-beta-D-glucopyranoside (CAS number 28757-27-9)
- Apigetrin, a flavone glucoside
- Aureusidin 6-rhamnoside (CAS number 124925-02-6)
- Demethyltexasin 4'-O-glucoside (CAS number 34307-23-8)
- Emodin 8-glucoside (Emodin-8-O-D-glucopyranoside, CAS number 23313-21-5)
- Galangin 7-glucoside (CAS number 68592-13-2)
- Galanginin (Galangin glycoside, CAS number 68592-14-3)
- Genistein 5-O-glucoside (CAS number 128508-06-5)
- Genistein 8-C-glucoside (CAS number 66026-80-0)
- Genistin (Genistein 7-glucoside, CAS number 529-59-9), an isoflavone
- Isogenistein 7-O-glucoside (CAS number 70943-69-0)
- Isovitexin, a flavone glucoside
- Kaempferide 3-alpha-L-arabinopyranoside (CAS number 123442-27-3)
- Kaempferol 4'-rhamnoside (CAS number 65063-32-3)
- Kaempferol 5-rhamnoside (CAS number 51171-70-1)
- Kaempferol 7-rhamnoside (CAS number 20196-89-8)
- Kaempferol 7-O-alpha-L-rhamnofuranoside (CAS number 5041-74-7)
- Luteolin 3'-rhamnoside (CAS number 99694-79-8)
- Luteolin 7-O-rhamnoside (CAS number 18016-54-1)
- Luteolin 3'-methyl ether 7-xyloside (CAS number 104759-65-1)
- Neovitexin (CAS number 29774-67-2)
- Resokaempferol 3-glucoside
- Resokaempferol 7-glucoside (CAS number 16290-10-1)
- Resokaempferol 4'-glucoside (CAS number 24502-04-3)
- Scutellarein 7-rhamnoside (CAS number 24512-68-3)
- Sophoricoside, an isoflavone glycoside
- Sulfurein (CAS number 531-63-5)
- Tetuin, a flavone glucoside
- Vitexin, a flavone glucoside
