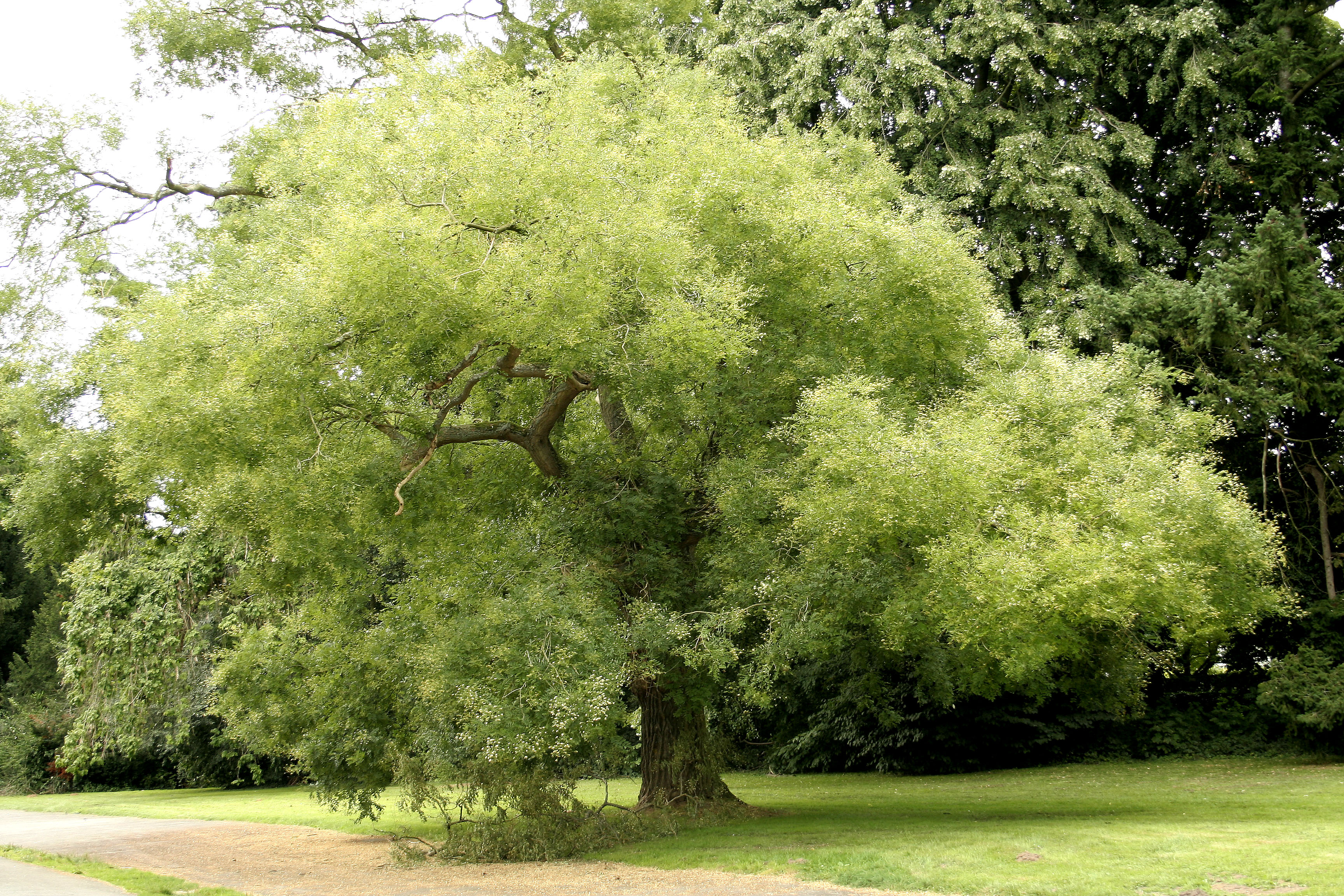
- Styphnolobium japonicum tree

Conservation status
- Data Deficient (IUCN 3.1)

Scientific classification
- Kingdom: Plantae
- Clade: Tracheophytes
- Clade: Angiosperms
- Clade: Eudicots
- Clade: Rosids
- Order: Fabales
- Family: Fabaceae
- Subfamily: Faboideae
- Genus: Styphnolobium
- Species: S. japonicum

Binomial name
- Styphnolobium japonicum (L.) Schott

Synonyms
- Sophora japonica L.; Sophora korolkowii Dieck; Sophora sinensis Forrest

= Styphnolobium japonicum =

Species of legume

Styphnolobium japonicum, the Japanese pagoda tree (also known as the Chinese scholar tree and pagoda tree; syn. Sophora japonica) is a species of deciduous tree in the subfamily Faboideae of the pea family Fabaceae.

It was formerly included within a broader interpretation of the genus Sophora. The species of Styphnolobium differ from Sophora in lacking the ability to form symbioses with rhizobia (nitrogen fixing bacteria) on their roots. It also differs from the related genus Calia (mescalbeans) in having deciduous leaves and flowers in axillary, not terminal, racemes. The leaves are alternate, pinnate, with nine to 21 leaflets, and the flowers in pendulous racemes similar to those of the black locust.

== Distribution ==
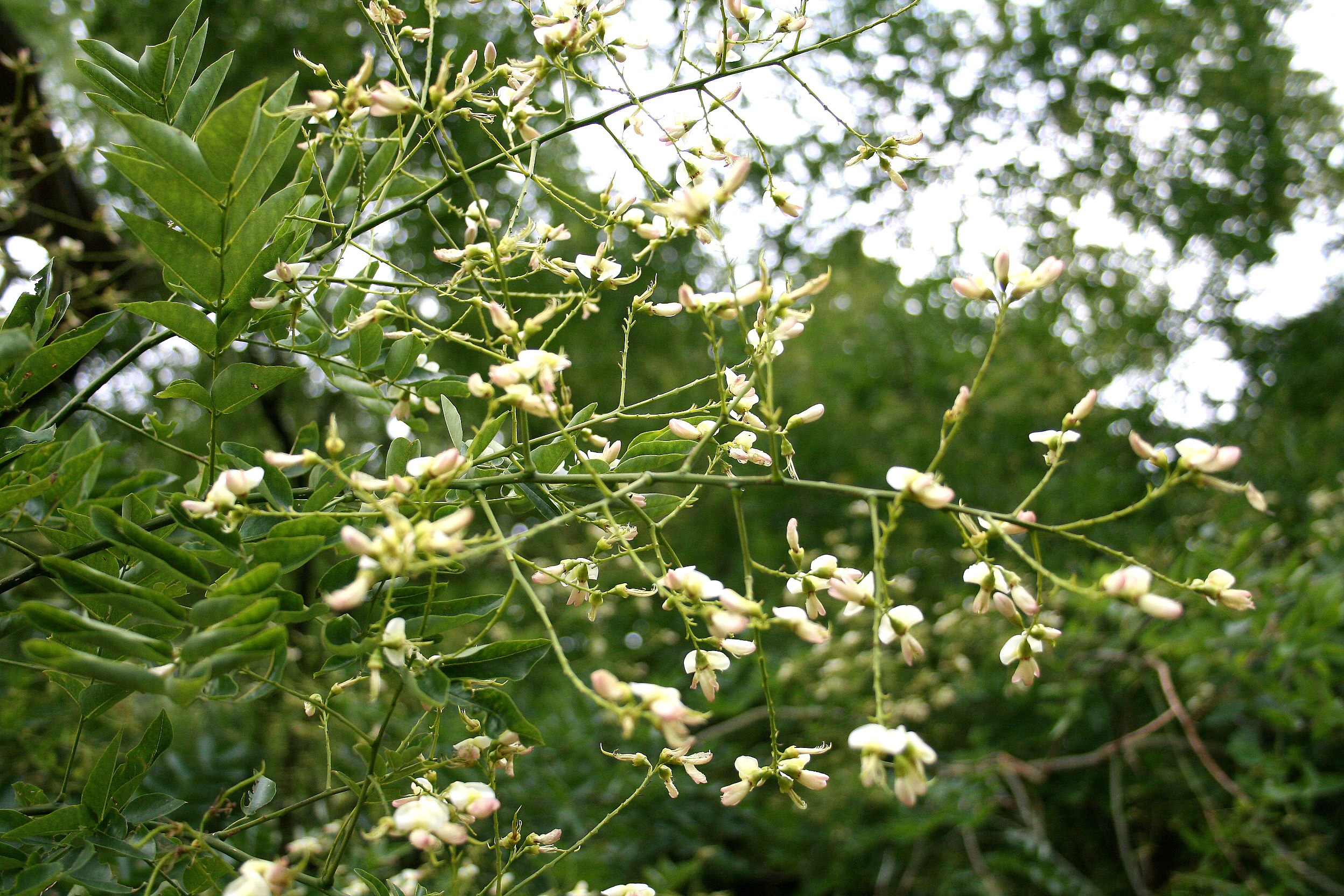
foliage and inflorescence

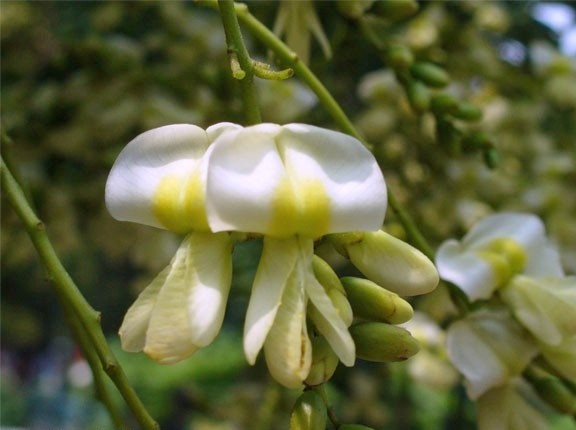
close-up of flowers

Styphnolobium japonicum is native to China. Despite its Latin name, the species was introduced in Japan and not originally found there. It is a popular ornamental tree in Europe, North America and South Africa, grown for its white flowers, borne in late summer after most other flowering trees have long finished flowering. It grows to 10–20 m tall with an equal spread, and produces a fine, dark brown timber.

== Uses ==
=== History ===
Despite its name, the Chinese scholar tree was not the official memorial tree of higher officials in Zhou dynasty China. The tombs of scholars were instead decorated with Koelreuteria paniculata.

The Guilty Chinese Scholartree is a historic pagoda tree in Beijing, from which the last emperor of the Ming dynasty, Chongzhen, hanged himself in 1644.

=== Traditional medicine ===
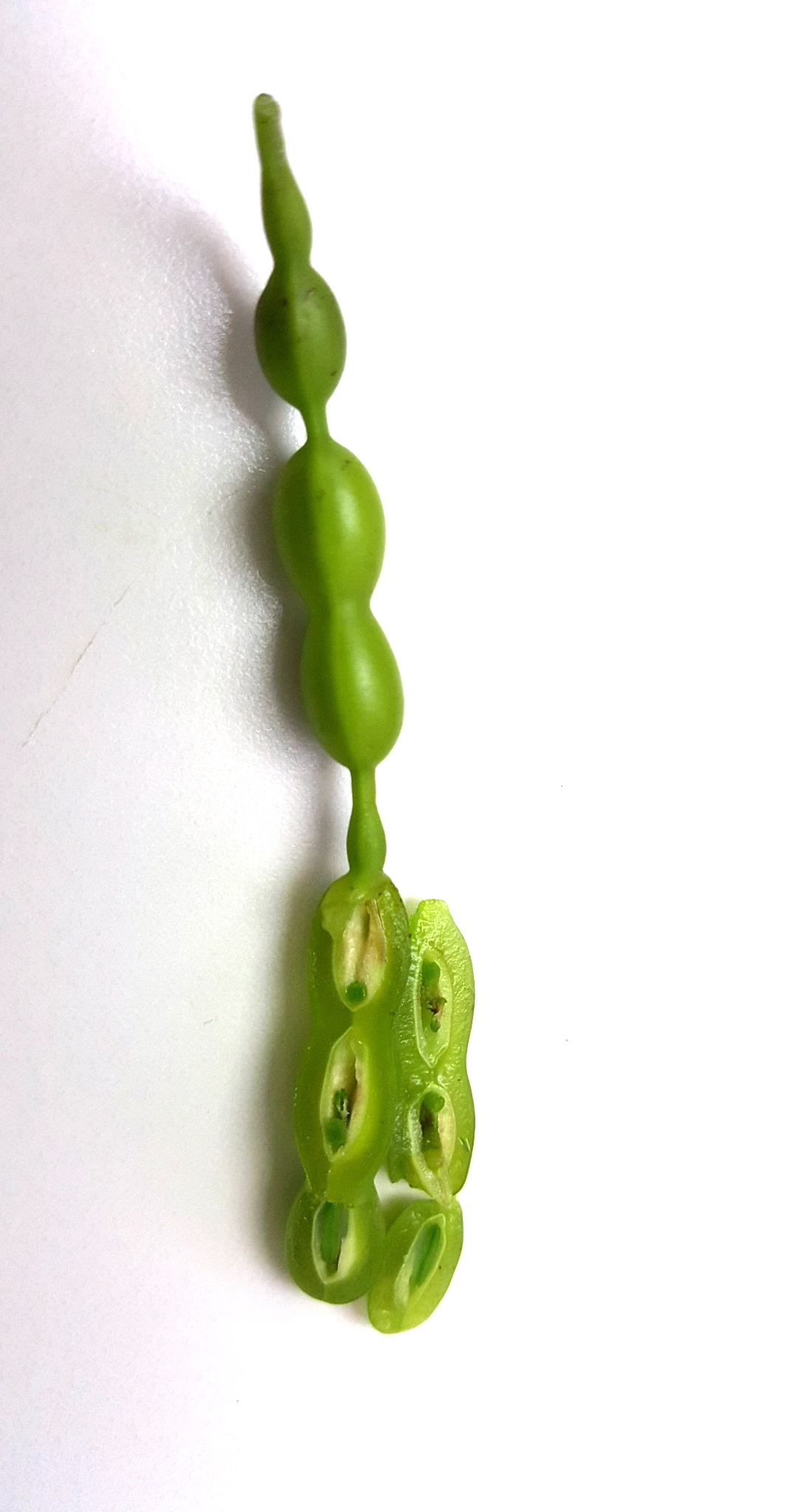
the beans

S. japonicum (Chinese: 槐; pinyin: huái; formerly Sophora japonica) is one of the 50 fundamental herbs used in traditional Chinese medicine. Its fruits have stress resistance and antioxidant properties.

=== Tea ===
The flowers and leaves are sometimes used for teas, such as by families in Laoshan Village, Shandong Province, China. It counts as a variety of herbal tea.

=== Construction uses ===
The wood is used to make the strong, springy curved "enju wood" handle used on the traditional Japanese woodworking adze, called the chouna. Pagoda wood is very hard after drying. This makes pagoda products durable and long lasting. The pagoda tree trunk is generally composed of alternating ridges of light-brown outside layers and gray brown inside layers. This makes wood carving products, for example from the Hokkaido native Ainu people, very decorative. The Ainu are famous for their carvings of Blakiston's fish owl.

== Chemistry ==
The dried flower buds may contain as much as 20% rutin with some quercetin. S. japonicum dried fruit contains the flavonoid glycosides sophoricoside, genistin and rutin and the flavonoid aglycones genistein, quercetin and kaempferol. Another analysis found genistein and genistein glycosides including sophorabioside, sophoricoside, genistein-7-diglucoside, genistein-7-diglucorhamnoside, and kaempferol and the kaempferol glycosides kaempferol-3-sophoroside and kaempferol-3-rhamnodiglucoside. The fruit also contain the alkaloids cytisine, N-methylcytisine, sophocarpine, matrine and stizolamine. The bark contains the allomatrine alkaloid.
