= C21H22O9 =

The molecular formula C_{21}H_{22}O_{9} (molar mass: 418.39 g/mol, exact mass: 418.1264 u) may refer to:

- Aloin, also known as barbaloin
- Liquiritin
- Natsudaidain, a flavanol
