= Benzododecinium bromide =

Names
- Preferred IUPAC name N-Benzyl-N,N-dimethyldodecan-1-aminium bromide

Identifiers
CAS Number	7281-04-1
3D model (JSmol)	Interactive image
ChEMBL	ChEMBL2355417
ChemSpider	22165
ECHA InfoCard	100.027.908
EC Number	230-698-4
PubChem CID	23705
UNII	IRY12B2TQ6
CompTox Dashboard (EPA)	DTXSID4048698
- InChI: InChI=1S/C21H38N.BrH/c1-4-5-6-7-8-9-10-11-12-16-19-22(2,3)20-21-17-14-13-15-18-21;/h13-15,17-18H,4-12,16,19-20H2,1-3H3;1H/q+1;/p-1 Key: KHSLHYAUZSPBIU-UHFFFAOYSA-M; InChI=1/C21H38N.BrH/c1-4-5-6-7-8-9-10-11-12-16-19-22(2,3)20-21-17-14-13-15-18-21;/h13-15,17-18H,4-12,16,19-20H2,1-3H3;1H/q+1;/p-1 Key: KHSLHYAUZSPBIU-REWHXWOFAH
- SMILES: [Br-].c1ccccc1C[N+](C)(CCCCCCCCCCCC)C

Properties
Chemical formula	C_{21}H_{38}N^{+} · Br^{−}
Molar mass	384.437 g·mol^{−1}

Pharmacology
ATC code	D09AA05 (WHO)
- Except where otherwise noted, data are given for materials in their standard state (at 25 °C [77 °F], 100 kPa). verify (what is ?) Infobox references

Benzododecinium bromide (systematic name dimethyldodecylbenzylammonium bromide) is a quaternary ammonium compound used as antiseptic and disinfectant (phenol coefficient is 20-30). It is highly soluble in water and has properties of cationic surfactant.

Benzododecinium bromide is effective against gram-positive microbes. In lower concentrations, its activity against conditionally gram-negative microorganisms (such as Proteus, Pseudomonas, Clostridium tetani etc.) is uncertain. It is not effective against Mycobacterium tuberculosis and bacterial spores. Longer expositions may inactivate some viruses.

Benzododecinium bromide is an active ingredient in the trademarked antiseptic product Ajatin produced in the Czech Republic. In place of bromide, the benzododecinium cation may be used with chloride or another anion.

== See also ==
- Carbethopendecinium bromide
- Benzalkonium chloride
