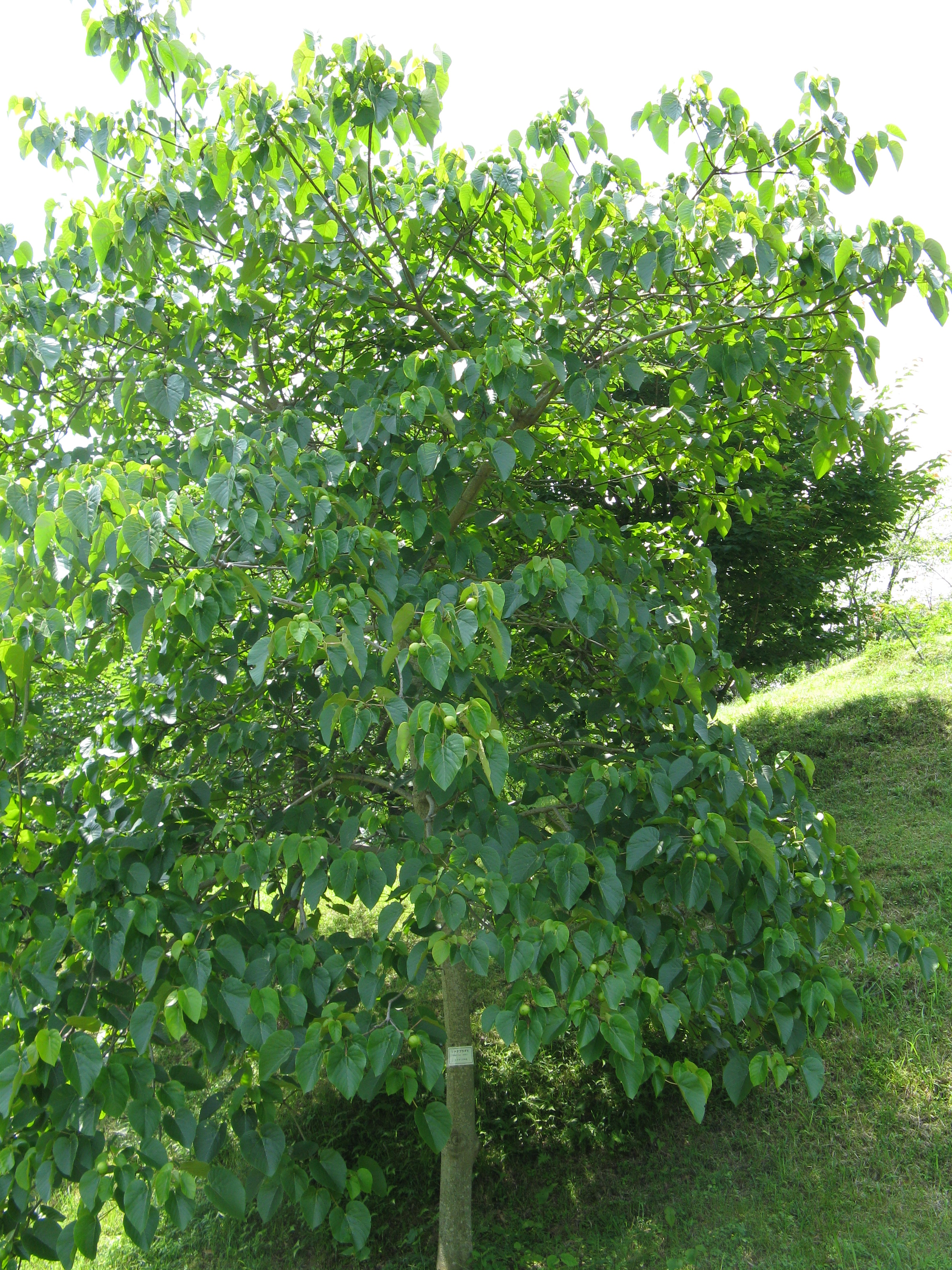

Conservation status
- Least Concern (IUCN 3.1)

Scientific classification
- Kingdom: Plantae
- Clade: Tracheophytes
- Clade: Angiosperms
- Clade: Eudicots
- Clade: Rosids
- Order: Malpighiales
- Family: Euphorbiaceae
- Genus: Vernicia
- Species: V. fordii

Binomial name
- Vernicia fordii (Hemsl.) Airy Shaw

Synonyms
- Aleurites fordii Hemsl.

= Vernicia fordii =

Species of tree

Vernicia fordii, usually known as the tung tree (Chinese: 桐, tóng) and also as the tung-oil or tungoil tree (油桐), the kalo nut tree, and the China wood-oil tree, is a species of flowering plant in the spurge family Euphorbiaceae. It is native to southern China, Myanmar, and northern Vietnam.

== Description ==
Vernicia fordii is a small to medium-sized deciduous tree growing to 20 metres (66 ft) tall, with a spreading crown. The bark is smooth and thin, and bleeds latex if cut. The leaves are alternate, simple, 4.5–25 cm long and 3.5–22 cm broad, heart-shaped or with three shallow, maple-like lobes, green above and below, red conspicuous glands at the base of the leaf, and with a 5.5–26 cm long petiole. The flowers are 2.5–3.5 cm diameter, with five pale pink to purple petals with streaks of darker red or purple in the throat; it is monoecious with individual flowers either male or female, but produced together in the inflorescences. The flowers appear before or with the leaves in loose, terminal clusters. The fruit is a hard, woody pear-shaped berry 4–6 cm long and 3–5 cm diameter, containing four or five large, oily seeds; it is green initially, becoming dull brown when ripe in autumn.

== Cultivation and uses ==
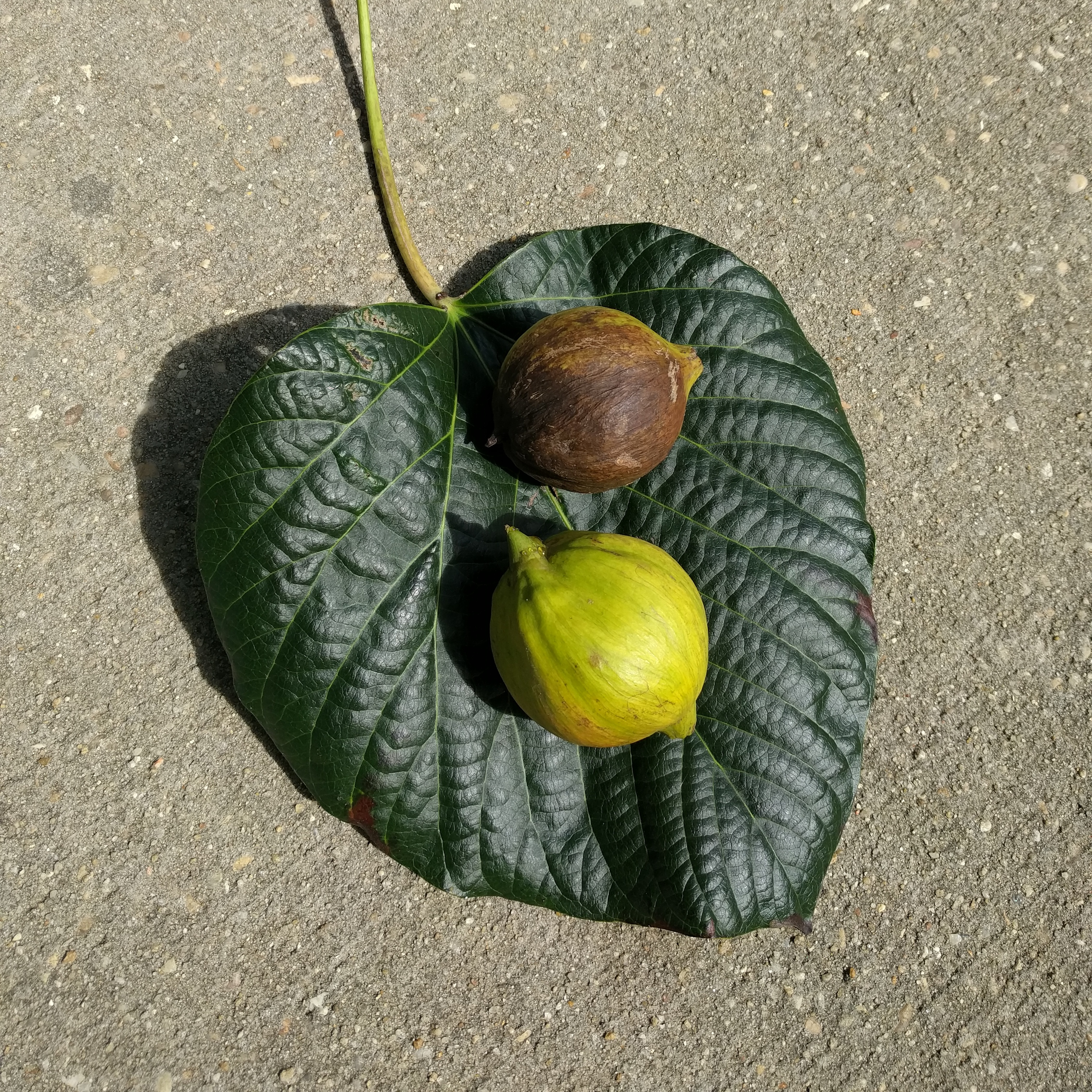
Tung tree leaf and fruit

The tung tree is valued for tung oil, which is derived from the seeds of the tree. Tung oil, also called China wood oil or nut oil, has traditionally been used in lamps in China. In modern times, it is used as an ingredient in paint, varnish, and caulk. It is also used as a wood finish for furniture and other wooden objects. After processing to remove gums in the oil, it was also used as a motor fuel. Marco Polo wrote in the 13th century "The Chinese take some lime and chopped hemp, and these they knead together with a certain wood oil; and when the three are thoroughly amalgamated they hold like any glue, and with this mixture they paint their ships".

It has been introduced to Argentina, Malawi, Paraguay, Thailand, and the United States for oil production. Just before World War I, a number of seeds received from the United States Ambassador to China were planted in California, but the young trees could not take hold in the dry climate. David Fairchild of the Department of Agriculture successfully introduced the tree in 1905 in the U.S. Gulf States from Florida to Texas. After flourishing from the 1920s to the 1940s the American tung oil industry was wiped out by frost and hurricanes. In 1969, many of the trees were wiped out by Hurricane Camille, and the plantations never recovered. Increased competition from overseas has ended cultivation in the United States and the tree is now listed as an invasive species in Florida.

Global production of the fruit rose from just over 100,000 tonnes in 1970 to almost 200,000 tonnes by 1980. Fruit yields are typically in the range of 4.5–5 tonnes per hectare. A number of cultivars have been selected for increased yield and small tree size, including 'Folsom', 'Cahl', 'Isabel', 'La Crosser', and 'Lampton'.

The wood of the tree is lightweight and strong, and is sometimes used as a substitute for balsa or basswood.

The tung tree is poisonous in all of its parts, including the fruit and the seeds, although some parts of the tree have been used for medicinal purposes in the past. According to the University of Florida Center for Aquatic and Invasive Plants, just one seed from the fruit can be fatal, and other symptoms may include vomiting, diarrhea, and slowed breathing. The leaves can also give a rash similar to that from poison ivy.

== Chemistry ==
The plant contains the coumarinolignoid aleuritin and 5,6,7-trimethoxy coumarin.
