= Hydroxyanthraquinone glucosyltransferase =

Class of enzymes

Identifiers
- EC no.: 2.4.1.181
- CAS no.: 112198-78-4

Databases
- IntEnz: IntEnz view
- BRENDA: BRENDA entry
- ExPASy: NiceZyme view
- KEGG: KEGG entry
- MetaCyc: metabolic pathway
- PRIAM: profile
- PDB structures: RCSB PDB PDBe PDBsum
- Gene Ontology: AmiGO / QuickGO
Search
- PMC: articles
- PubMed: articles
- NCBI: proteins

Hydroxyanthraquinone glucosyltransferase (EC 2.4.1.181) is an enzyme that catalyzes the general chemical reaction

UDP-glucose + a hydroxyanthraquinone $\rightleftharpoons$ UDP + a glucosyloxyanthraquinone

The two substrates of this enzyme characterised from Cinchona succiruba are a hydroxyanthraquinone and UDP-glucose. Its products are the corresponding glucosylated anthraquinone and uridine diphosphate (UDP). For example, emodin, an active component of several plants used in traditional Chinese medicine, is converted to emodin-8-glucoside:

emodin
+ UDP-glucose
UDP
emodin-8-glucoside

This enzyme belongs to the family of glycosyltransferases, specifically the hexosyltransferases. The systematic name of this enzyme class is UDP-glucose:hydroxyanthraquinone O-glucosyltransferase. Other names in common use include uridine diphosphoglucose-anthraquinone glucosyltransferase, and anthraquinone-specific glucosyltransferase.
