= C21H20O9 =

The molecular formula C_{21}H_{20}O_{9} (molar mass: 416.38 g/mol, exact mass: 416.1107 u) may refer to:

- Aleuritin, a coumarinolignoid
- Daidzin, an isoflavone
- Puerarin, an isoflavone
