= Repenin =

Repenins are a group of chemical compounds which are classified as coumarinolignoids. They were first isolated from the golden dewdrop plant (Duranta repens) and characterized in 2009.

Since golden dewdrop has been used in traditional herbal medicine, there has been interest in investigating the potential pharmacological properties of repenins and other chemical compounds found in golden dewdrop.

== Chemical strucutures ==
Repenin A

Repenin B

Repenin C

Repenin D
