= ATC code D09 =

ATC code D09 Medicated dressings is a therapeutic subgroup of the Anatomical Therapeutic Chemical Classification System, a system of alphanumeric codes developed by the World Health Organization (WHO) for the classification of drugs and other medical products. Subgroup D09 is part of the anatomical group D Dermatologicals.

Codes for veterinary use (ATCvet codes) can be created by placing the letter Q in front of the human ATC code: for example, QD09.
National versions of the ATC classification may include additional codes not present in this list, which follows the WHO version.

== D09A Medicated dressings ==
=== D09AA Medicated dressings with antiinfectives ===
D09AA01 Framycetin
D09AA02 Fusidic acid
D09AA03 Nitrofural
D09AA04 Phenylmercuric nitrate
D09AA05 Benzododecinium
D09AA06 Triclosan
D09AA07 Cetylpyridinium
D09AA08 Aluminium chlorohydrate
D09AA09 Povidone-iodine
D09AA10 Clioquinol
D09AA11 Benzalkonium
D09AA12 Chlorhexidine
D09AA13 Iodoform

=== D09AB Zinc bandages ===
D09AB01 Zinc bandage without supplements
D09AB02 Zinc bandage with supplements
