= Cacotheline =

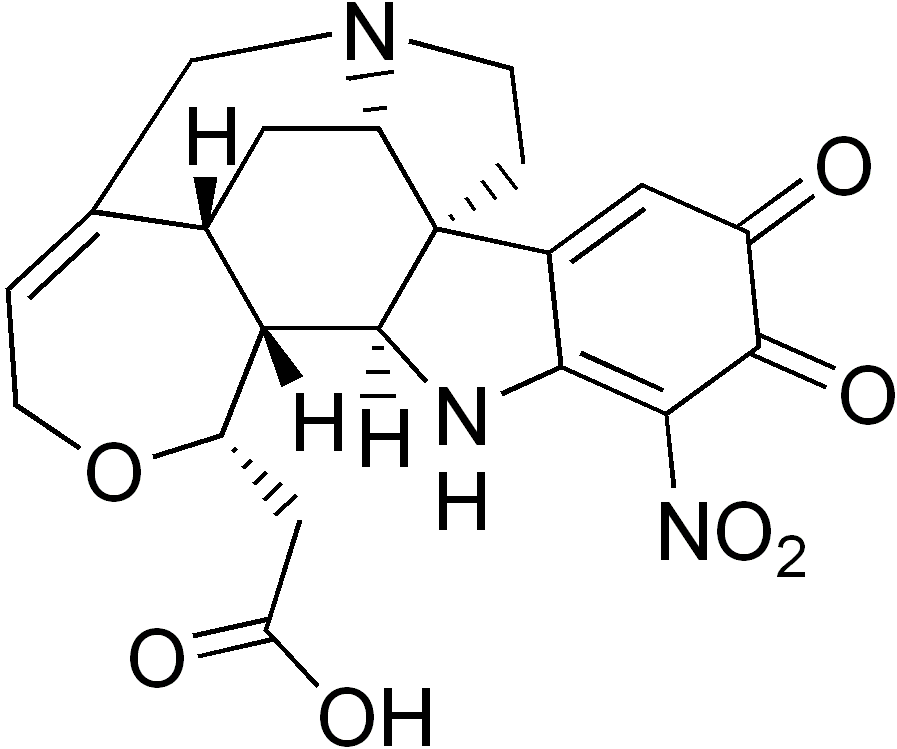

Names
- IUPAC name 4-Nitro-2,3-dioxo-2,3-dihydro-9,10-secostrychnidin-10-oic acid
- Systematic IUPAC name [(4bS,7aS,8aR,13S,13aR,13bS)-1-Nitro-2,3-dioxo-2,3,5,6,7a,8,8a,11,13,13a,13b,14-dodecahydro-7,9-methanooxepino[3,4-a]pyrrolo[2,3-d]carbazol-13-yl]acetic acid
- Other names 2,3-Dihydro-4-nitro-2,3-dioxo-9,10-secostrychnidin-10-oic acid

Identifiers
CAS Number	561-20-6
3D model (JSmol)	Interactive image
ChemSpider	61696
ECHA InfoCard	100.008.378
PubChem CID	68413
UNII	BAO9DAZ037
CompTox Dashboard (EPA)	DTXSID00889352
- InChI: InChI=1/C21H21N3O7/c25-12-6-11-17(18(19(12)28)24(29)30)22-20-16-10-5-14-21(11,20)2-3-23(14)8-9(10)1-4-31-13(16)7-15(26)27/h1,6,10,13-14,16,20,22H,2-5,7-8H2,(H,26,27)/t10-,13-,14-,16-,20-,21+/m0/s1 Key: IVEMPCACOMNRGI-OFDJEBHLBG
- SMILES: [O-][N+](=O)C=1C(=O)C(=O)/C=C3\C=1N[C@H]4[C@H]2[C@@H]6/C(=C\CO[C@H]2CC(=O)O)CN5CC[C@]34[C@@H]5C6

Properties
Chemical formula	C_{21}H_{21}N_{3}O_{7}
Molar mass	427.41 g/mol
Appearance	Yellow crystals
Density	1.62 g/cm^{3}

Hazards
Flash point	374.6 °C (706.3 °F; 647.8 K)
- Except where otherwise noted, data are given for materials in their standard state (at 25 °C [77 °F], 100 kPa). Infobox references

Cacotheline is an organic compound with the chemical formula C_{21}H_{21}N_{3}O_{7}. It is a nitro derivative of brucine obtained by reaction of brucine with nitric acid. It is used as an indicator in the titrimetric analysis of tin ions (Sn^{2+}).
