= C21H22O12 =

The molecular formula C_{21}H_{22}O_{12} (molar mass: 466.39 g/mol, exact mass: 466.1111 u) may refer to:

- Xeractinol
