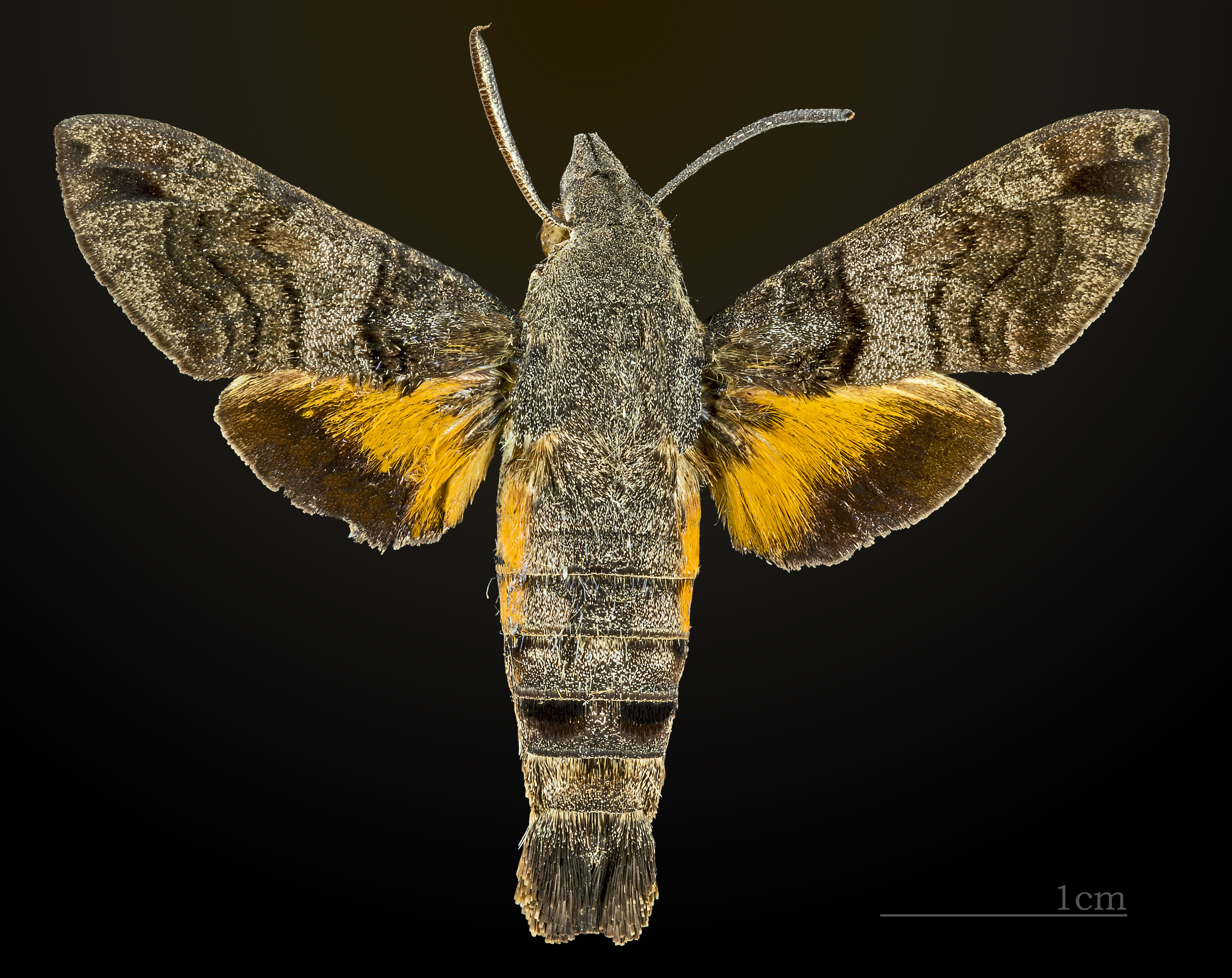
- Dorsal view
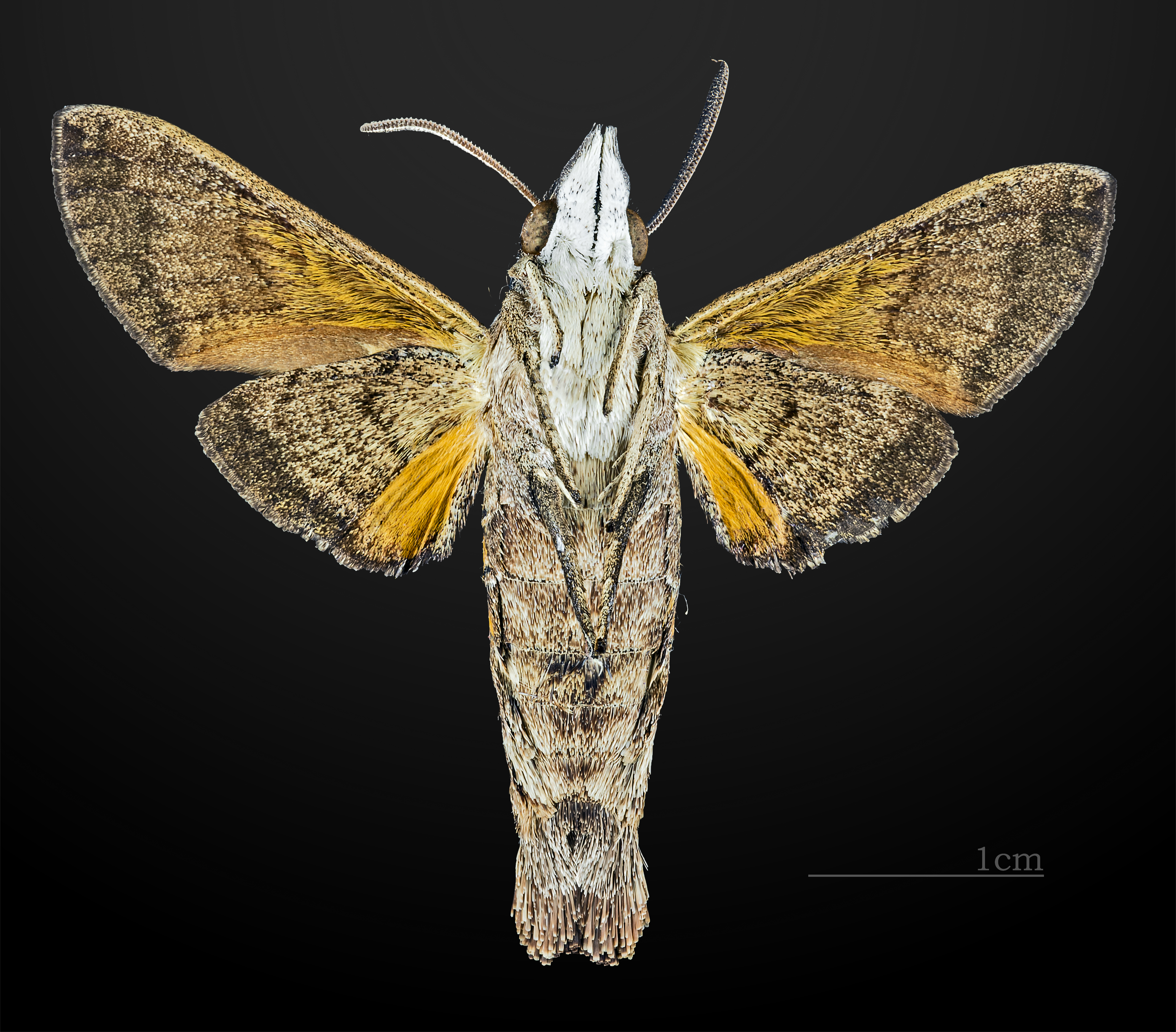
- Ventral view

Scientific classification
- Kingdom: Animalia
- Phylum: Arthropoda
- Class: Insecta
- Order: Lepidoptera
- Family: Sphingidae
- Genus: Macroglossum
- Species: M. affictitia

Binomial name
- Macroglossum affictitia Butler, 1875

Synonyms
- Macroglossa vialis Butler, 1875

= Macroglossum affictitia =

Dark-bordered hummingbird hawkmoth

Species of moth

Macroglossum affictitia, the dark-bordered hummingbird hawkmoth, is a moth of the family Sphingidae. It is known from Sri Lanka and southern India to Myanmar, Thailand and south-western Yunnan, China. It was described by Arthur Gardiner Butler in 1875.

The length of the forewings is 16–22 mm. It is similar in colour to Macroglossum gyrans. The sides of the thorax and legs are dull drab russet. The abdomen underside is without white mesial patches and the underside of the tail is the same colour. The forewing upperside has prominent antemedian black double lines. These are located close together, the space between more or less filled with black. The median area is grey and the discal lines thin and not prominent. The hindwing upperside is blackish brown at the base, as is the broad distal border band. The median band is yellowish orange or more tawny.

The larvae feed on Strychnos species.
