= C21H20O12 =

The molecular formula C_{21}H_{20}O_{12} (molar mass: 464.37 g/mol, exact mass: 464.095476 u) may refer to:

- Hyperoside
- Isoquercetin
- Myricitrin, a flavonol
- Spiraeoside, a flavonol
