= Coumarinolignoid =

Aleuritin, a coumarinolignoid found in Aleurites fordii.

Coumarinolignoids are a class of phenolic compounds. They are a subset of lignans in which one of the two phenylpropanoids is found in the form of a coumarin.

== Examples ==
- 2-(4-hydroxy-3,5-dimethoxyphenyl)-3-hydroxymethyl-2,3-dihydro-1,4,5-trioxaphenanthren-6-one can be found on Paullinia pinnata
- 5'-hydroxycleomiscosin B, found in Eurycorymbus cavaleriei
- 5-Methoxypropacin found in Protium unifoliolatum
- Moluccanin, found in Aleurites moluccanus, synthesised by Kim et al in 2023.
- Aleuritin, found in Aleurites fordii
- Durantin A and repenins, isolated from Duranta
