= Fominoben =

Chemical compound

Clinical data
- Trade names: Broncomenal, Deronyl, Finaten, Noleptan, Oleptan, Terion, Tosifar, Tussirama

Identifiers
- IUPAC name: N-[3-chloro-2-[[methyl-(2-morpholin-4-yl-2-oxoethyl)amino]methyl]phenyl]benzamide
- CAS Number: 18053-31-1
- PubChem CID: 3407
- DrugBank: DB08968
- ChemSpider: 3290
- UNII: TJ2KK6NYJS
- KEGG: D07988
- ChEBI: CHEBI:135639
- ChEMBL: ChEMBL1697837
- CompTox Dashboard (EPA): DTXSID1023075
- ECHA InfoCard: 100.038.135

Chemical and physical data
- Formula: C_{21}H_{24}ClN_{3}O_{3}
- Molar mass: 401.89 g·mol^{−1}
- 3D model (JSmol): Interactive image
- SMILES: CN(CC1=C(C=CC=C1Cl)NC(=O)C2=CC=CC=C2)CC(=O)N3CCOCC3
- InChI: InChI=1S/C21H24ClN3O3/c1-24(15-20(26)25-10-12-28-13-11-25)14-17-18(22)8-5-9-19(17)23-21(27)16-6-3-2-4-7-16/h2-9H,10-15H2,1H3,(H,23,27); Key:KSNNEUZOAFRTDS-UHFFFAOYSA-N

Fominoben is an antitussive agent of the benzanilide class, formerly marketed under the name Noleptan. It binds poorly to the sigma-1 receptor, a receptor activated by many other antitussives. It is reported to have respiratory stimulant activity. Other research has indicated it may be an agonist at the benzodiazepine site of the GABA_{A} receptor. It was introduced in Germany in 1973, in Italy in 1979, and in Japan in 1983.

Adverse effects include appetite suppression, nausea, vomiting, insomnia, irritability, and hallucinations. Rarer side effects include somnolence, dizziness, dry mouth, blurred vision, and urticaria.
