= C21H21O11+ =

The molecular formula C_{21}H_{21}O_{11}^{+} (molar mass: 449.38 g/mol, exact mass: 449.108386 u) may refer to:

- Chrysanthemin, an anthocyanin
- Idaein, an anthocyanin
