= Aleuritin =

Names
- IUPAC name 3-(4-hydroxy-3,5-dimethoxyphenyl)-2-(hydroxymethyl)-5-methoxy-2,3-dihydro-8H-[1,4]dioxino[2,3-f]chromen-8-one

Identifiers
CAS Number	124901-94-6
3D model (JSmol)	Interactive image
PubChem CID	139031048
UNII	53U6TM93FE
CompTox Dashboard (EPA)	DTXSID801045374
- InChI: InChI=1S/C21H20O9/c1-25-13-6-10(7-14(26-2)18(13)24)19-16(9-22)29-20-11-4-5-17(23)28-12(11)8-15(27-3)21(20)30-19/h4-8,16,19,22,24H,9H2,1-3H3 Key: ITFXDKZROOJSKV-UHFFFAOYSA-N
- SMILES: COc1cc(cc(OC)c1O)C2Oc3c(OC2CO)c4C=CC(=O)Oc4cc3OC

Properties
Chemical formula	C_{21}H_{20}O_{9}
Molar mass	416.37 g/mol
- Except where otherwise noted, data are given for materials in their standard state (at 25 °C [77 °F], 100 kPa). Infobox references

Aleuritin is a coumarinolignoid found in the tree Aleurites fordii.
