= Sophoricoside =

Names
- IUPAC name 4′-(β-D-Glucopyranosyloxy)-5,7-dihydroxyisoflavone
- Systematic IUPAC name 5,7-Dihydroxy-3-(4-{[(2S,3R,4S,5S,6R)-3,4,5-trihydroxy-6-(hydroxymethyl)oxan-2-yl]oxy}phenyl)-4H-1-benzopyran-4-one
- Other names Genistein β-glucoside; 4-(5,7-dihydroxy-4-oxo-4H-chromen-3-yl)phenylbeta-D-glucopyranoside; 4-(5,7-Dihydroxy-4-oxo-4H-chromen-3-yl)phenylalpha-L-gulopyranoside

Identifiers
| CAS Number | 152-95-4 |
| 3D model (JSmol) | Interactive image |
| ChemSpider | 4479150 |
| PubChem CID | 5321398 |
| UNII | J0407L5MGM |
| CompTox Dashboard (EPA) | DTXSID601017840 |
- InChI: InChI=1S/C21H20O10/c22-7-15-18(26)19(27)20(28)21(31-15)30-11-3-1-9(2-4-11)12-8-29-14-6-10(23)5-13(24)16(14)17(12)25/h1-6,8,15,18-24,26-28H,7H2/t15-,18-,19+,20-,21-/m1/s1 Key: ISQRJFLLIDGZEP-CMWLGVBASA-N; InChI=1/C21H20O10/c22-7-15-18(26)19(27)20(28)21(31-15)30-11-3-1-9(2-4-11)12-8-29-14-6-10(23)5-13(24)16(14)17(12)25/h1-6,8,15,18-24,26-28H,7H2/t15-,18-,19+,20-,21-/m1/s1 Key: ISQRJFLLIDGZEP-CMWLGVBABN
- SMILES: O=C/1c4c(O)cc(O)cc4O\C=C\1c3ccc(O[C@@H]2O[C@@H]([C@@H](O)[C@H](O)[C@H]2O)CO)cc3

Properties
| Chemical formula | C_{21}H_{20}O_{10} |
| Molar mass | 432.381 g·mol^{−1} |
| Appearance | Pale yellow solid |
- Except where otherwise noted, data are given for materials in their standard state (at 25 °C [77 °F], 100 kPa). Infobox references

Sophoricoside is an isoflavone genistein glycoside found in the dried ripe fruit of Styphnolobium japonicum (L.) Schott, which is used in traditional Chinese medicine. At the time the chemical was discovered and named, the plant was called Sophora japonica L.
