= C21H18O12 =

The molecular formula C_{21}H_{18}O_{12} (molar mass: 462.36 g/mol, exact mass: 462.079826 u) may refer to:

- Scutellarin, a flavone glucuronide
- Luteolin-7-O-glucuronide, a flavone glucuronide
