= Liquiritin =

Names
- IUPAC name (2S)-4′-(β-D-Glucopyranosyloxy)-7-hydroxyflavan-4-one
- Systematic IUPAC name (2S)-7-Hydroxy-4-(4-{[(2S,3R,4S,5S,6R)-3,4,5-trihydroxy-6-(hydroxymethyl)oxan-2-yl]oxy}phenyl)-2,3-dihydro-4H-1-benzopyran-4-one
- Other names Liquiritoside; Liquiritigenin-4'-O-glucoside

Identifiers
CAS Number	551-15-5
3D model (JSmol)	Interactive image
ChEBI	CHEBI:80845
ChemSpider	439855
PubChem CID	503737
UNII	T0O79T74CD
CompTox Dashboard (EPA)	DTXSID40203619
- InChI: InChI=1S/C21H22O9/c22-9-17-18(25)19(26)20(27)21(30-17)28-12-4-1-10(2-5-12)15-8-14(24)13-6-3-11(23)7-16(13)29-15/h1-7,15,17-23,25-27H,8-9H2/t15-,17+,18+,19-,20+,21+/m0/s1 Key: DEMKZLAVQYISIA-ZRWXNEIDSA-N; InChI=1/C21H22O9/c22-9-17-18(25)19(26)20(27)21(30-17)28-12-4-1-10(2-5-12)15-8-14(24)13-6-3-11(23)7-16(13)29-15/h1-7,15,17-23,25-27H,8-9H2/t15-,17+,18+,19-,20+,21+/m0/s1 Key: DEMKZLAVQYISIA-ZRWXNEIDBX
- SMILES: C1[C@H](OC2=C(C1=O)C=CC(=C2)O)C3=CC=C(C=C3)O[C@H]4[C@@H]([C@H]([C@@H]([C@H](O4)CO)O)O)O

Properties
Chemical formula	C_{21}H_{22}O_{9}
Molar mass	418.398 g·mol^{−1}
- Except where otherwise noted, data are given for materials in their standard state (at 25 °C [77 °F], 100 kPa). Infobox references

Liquiritin is the 4'-O-glucoside of the flavanone liquiritigenin. Liquiritin is one of flavone compounds derived from licorice.
