= Emodin-8-glucoside =

Clinical data
- Other names: EG; Emodin-8-O-β-D-glucopyranoside
- Drug class: Serotonin 5-HT_{1B} receptor agonist
- ATC code: None

Identifiers
- IUPAC name: 1,6-dihydroxy-3-methyl-8-[(2S,3R,4S,5S,6R)-3,4,5-trihydroxy-6-(hydroxymethyl)oxan-2-yl]oxyanthracene-9,10-dione
- CAS Number: 23313-21-5
- PubChem CID: 99649
- ChemSpider: 90027
- UNII: YY0Q8Q1T3H
- KEGG: C10345
- ChEBI: CHEBI:4783
- ChEMBL: ChEMBL464360
- CompTox Dashboard (EPA): DTXSID60945988

Chemical and physical data
- Formula: C_{21}H_{20}O_{10}
- Molar mass: 432.381 g·mol^{−1}
- 3D model (JSmol): Interactive image
- SMILES: CC1=CC2=C(C(=C1)O)C(=O)C3=C(C2=O)C=C(C=C3O[C@H]4[C@@H]([C@H]([C@@H]([C@H](O4)CO)O)O)O)O
- InChI: InChI=1S/C21H20O10/c1-7-2-9-14(11(24)3-7)18(27)15-10(16(9)25)4-8(23)5-12(15)30-21-20(29)19(28)17(26)13(6-22)31-21/h2-5,13,17,19-24,26,28-29H,6H2,1H3/t13-,17-,19+,20-,21-/m1/s1; Key:HSWIRQIYASIOBE-JNHRPPPUSA-N

Emodin-8-glucoside (EG) is a natural product found in various plants used in traditional herbal medicine such as Aloe vera, Polygonum multiflorum, and Rheum officinale.

== Pharmacology ==
=== Pharmacodynamics ===
Emodin-8-glucoside has antiviral effects, and has a complex mechanism of action, acting as a serotonin 5-HT_{1B} agonist as well as an activator of PPARα/PPARγ and AMPK.

== Biosynthesis ==
The enzyme hydroxyanthraquinone glucosyltransferase, characterised from Cinchona succiruba, converts the hydroxyanthraquinone, emodin, to its glucosylated derivative, emodin-8-glucoside. The glucose unit is transferred from UDP-glucose, with uridine diphosphate (UDP) as byproduct.

emodin
+ UDP-glucose
UDP
emodin-8-glucoside
