= Carbethopendecinium bromide =

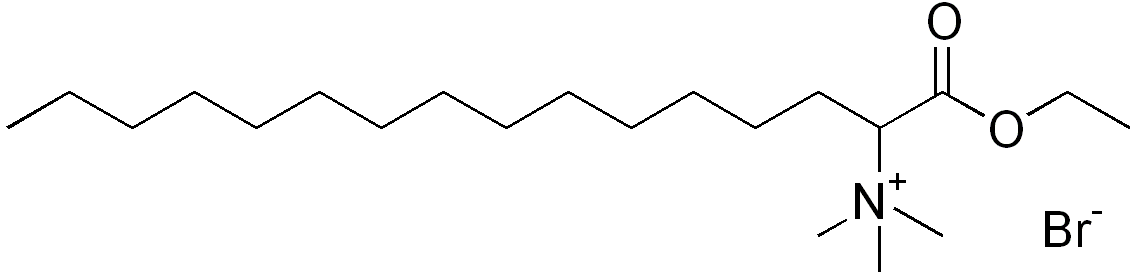

Names
- IUPAC name (1-ethoxy-1-oxohexadecan-2-yl)-trimethylazanium bromide
- Other names Carbaethopendecine bromide; [1-(ethoxycarbonyl)pentadecyl]trimethylammonium bromide

Identifiers
CAS Number	10567-02-9
3D model (JSmol)	Interactive image; Interactive image
ChemSpider	141396
ECHA InfoCard	100.210.920
PubChem CID	160944
UNII	0T45P766JT
CompTox Dashboard (EPA)	DTXSID10909676
- InChI: InChI=1S/C21H44NO2.BrH/c1-6-8-9-10-11-12-13-14-15-16-17-18-19-20(22(3,4)5)21(23)24-7-2;/h20H,6-19H2,1-5H3;1H/q+1;/p-1 Key: FXQJFHYFOGHZTB-UHFFFAOYSA-M; InChI=1/C21H44NO2.BrH/c1-6-8-9-10-11-12-13-14-15-16-17-18-19-20(22(3,4)5)21(23)24-7-2;/h20H,6-19H2,1-5H3;1H/q+1;/p-1 Key: FXQJFHYFOGHZTB-REWHXWOFAR
- SMILES: CCCCCCCCCCCCCCC(C(=O)OCC)[N+](C)(C)C.[Br-]; [Br-].O=C(OCC)C(CCCCCCCCCCCCCC)[N+](C)(C)C

Properties
Chemical formula	C_{21}H_{44}BrNO_{2}
Molar mass	422.48 g/mol
- Except where otherwise noted, data are given for materials in their standard state (at 25 °C [77 °F], 100 kPa). verify (what is ?) Infobox references

Carbethopendecinium bromide is a quaternary ammonium compound used as antiseptic and disinfectant. It is white to yellowish crystalline powder. It is well soluble in water, ethanol and chloroform; its water solutions foam strongly if shaken.

Carbethopendecinium bromide is the active substance in antiseptic and disinfecting products prepared in the Czech Republic under the trademarks Septonex (also Ophtalmo-Septonex, Mukoseptonex etc.) and Otipur. In small quantities, it is contained in other products as auxiliary substance too.
