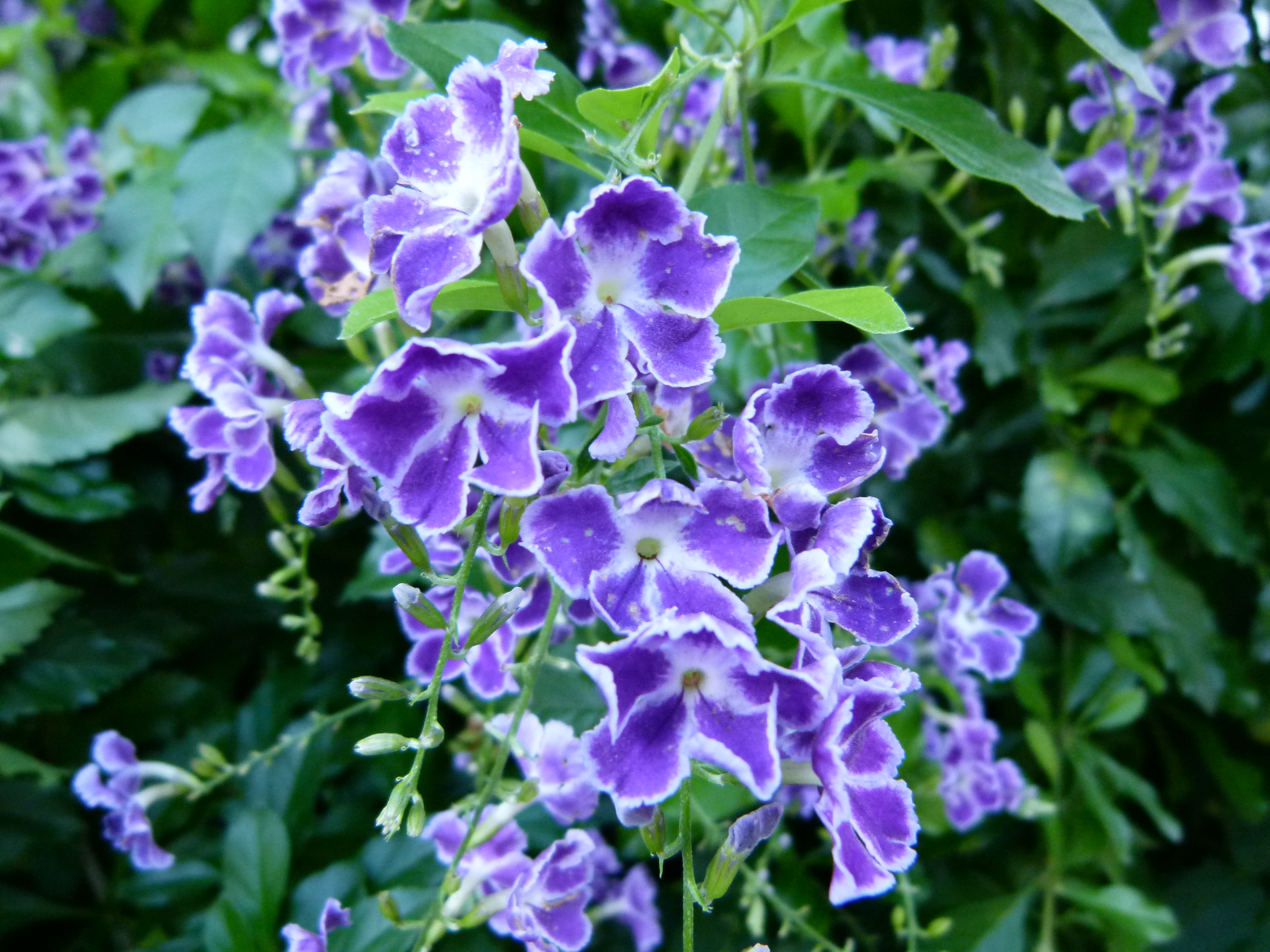

Conservation status
- Least Concern (IUCN 3.1)

- Secure (NatureServe)

Scientific classification
- Kingdom: Plantae
- Clade: Tracheophytes
- Clade: Angiosperms
- Clade: Eudicots
- Clade: Asterids
- Order: Lamiales
- Family: Verbenaceae
- Genus: Duranta
- Species: D. erecta

Binomial name
- Duranta erecta L.

Synonyms
- Duranta repens L.

= Duranta erecta =

Species of flowering plant

Duranta erecta is a species of flowering shrub in the verbena family Verbenaceae, native from Mexico to South America and the Caribbean. It is widely cultivated as an ornamental plant in tropical and subtropical gardens throughout the world, and has become naturalized in many places. Common names include golden dewdrop, pigeon berry, and skyflower.

== Description ==
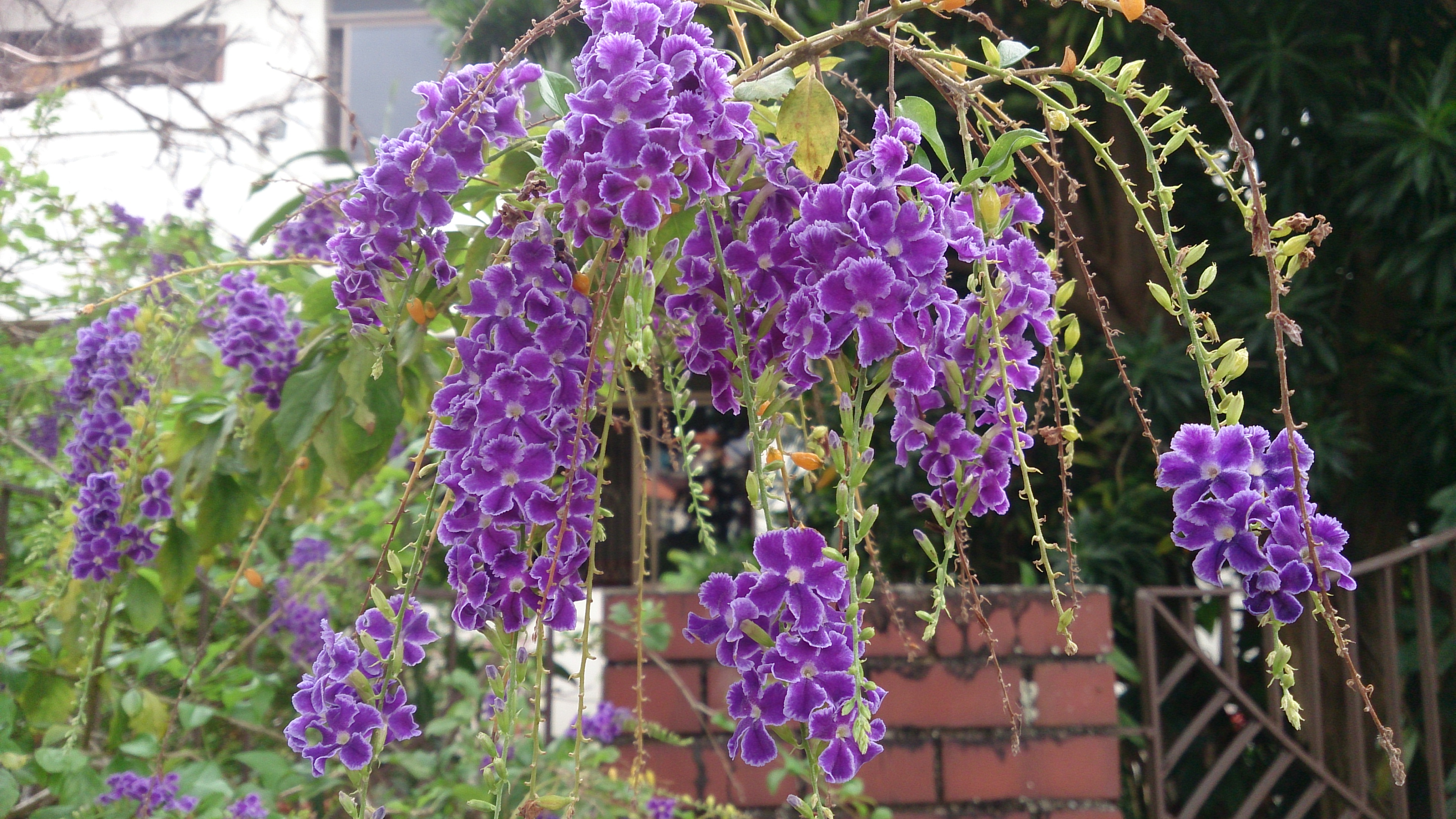
Cascading flowers

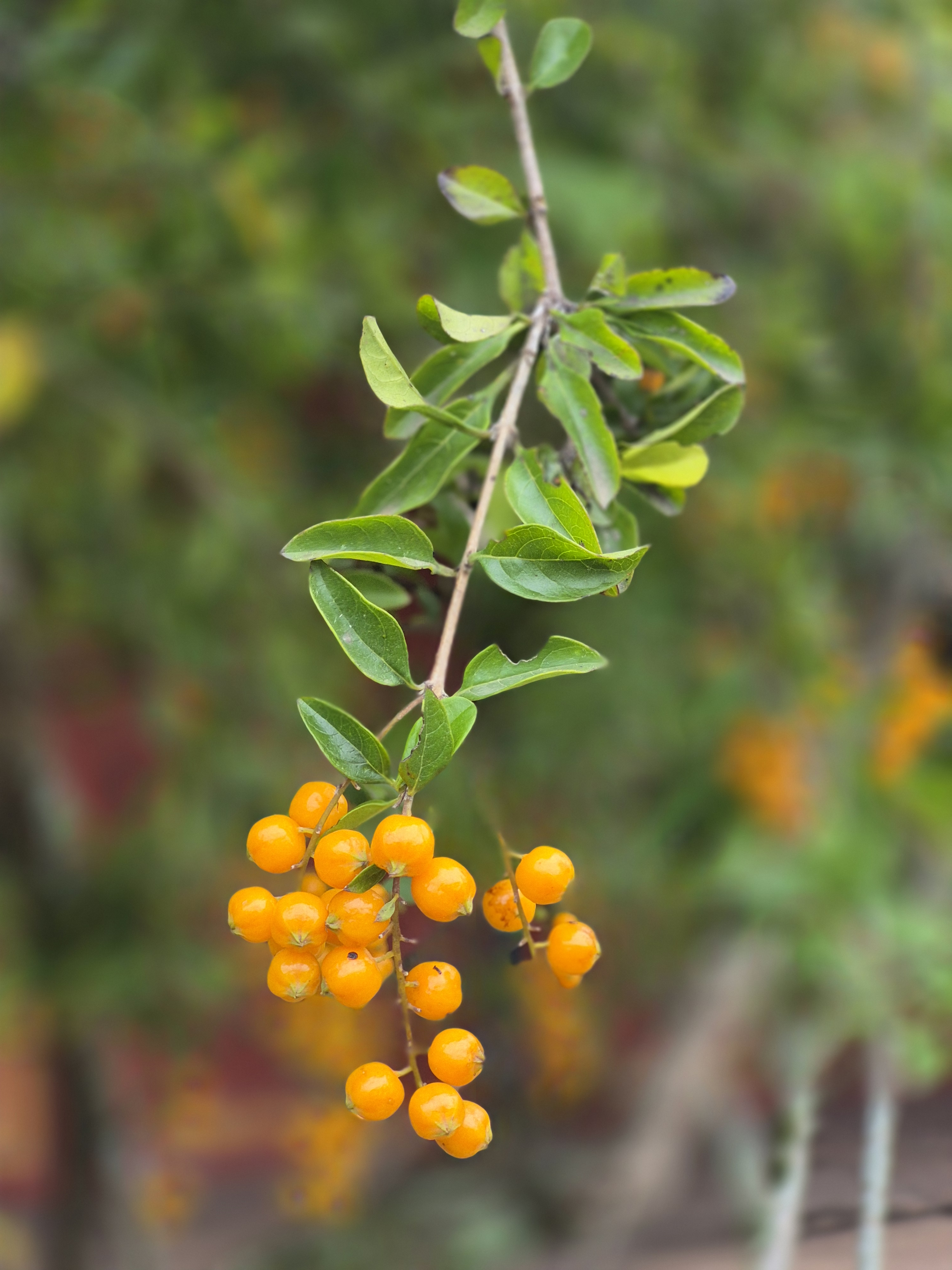
Fruits

Duranta erecta is a sprawling shrub or (infrequently) a small tree. It can grow to 6 m (20 ft) tall and can spread to an equal width. Mature specimens possess axillary thorns, which are often absent on younger specimens. The leaves are light green, elliptic to ovate, opposite, and grow up to 7.5 cm (3.0 in) long and 3.5 cm (1.4 in) broad, with a 1.5 cm (0.59 in) petiole.

The flowers are light-blue or lavender, produced in tight clusters located on terminal and axillary stems, sometimes appearing as panicles, frequently recurved or pendulous, blooming in summer. The fruit is a small globose yellow or orange berry, up to 11 mm (0.43 in) diameter and containing several seeds.

== Taxonomy ==
The genus name is in honor of Castore Durante, a fifteenth-century Italian botanist. The specific epithet erecta means "upright" in Latin. The plant is also known as D. repens, from the Latin for "creeping". The latter name was originally used to identify smaller-leaved varieties of the species.

== Ecology ==
Duranta erecta is native to the Americas, from Mexico and the Caribbean south to Brazil and Argentina. There is some debate about whether the plant is also native to the southern United States, in Florida, Louisiana, Texas, Arizona and California, or is an introduced species there, at an altitude of 40–1,100 metres (130–3,610 ft) above sea level.

In its natural state, it commonly grows in rocky or sandy coastal areas with full sun, or moister, disturbed sites inland. Prior to maturity, the plant will grow at a rate of up to half a metre per year.

== Cultivation ==
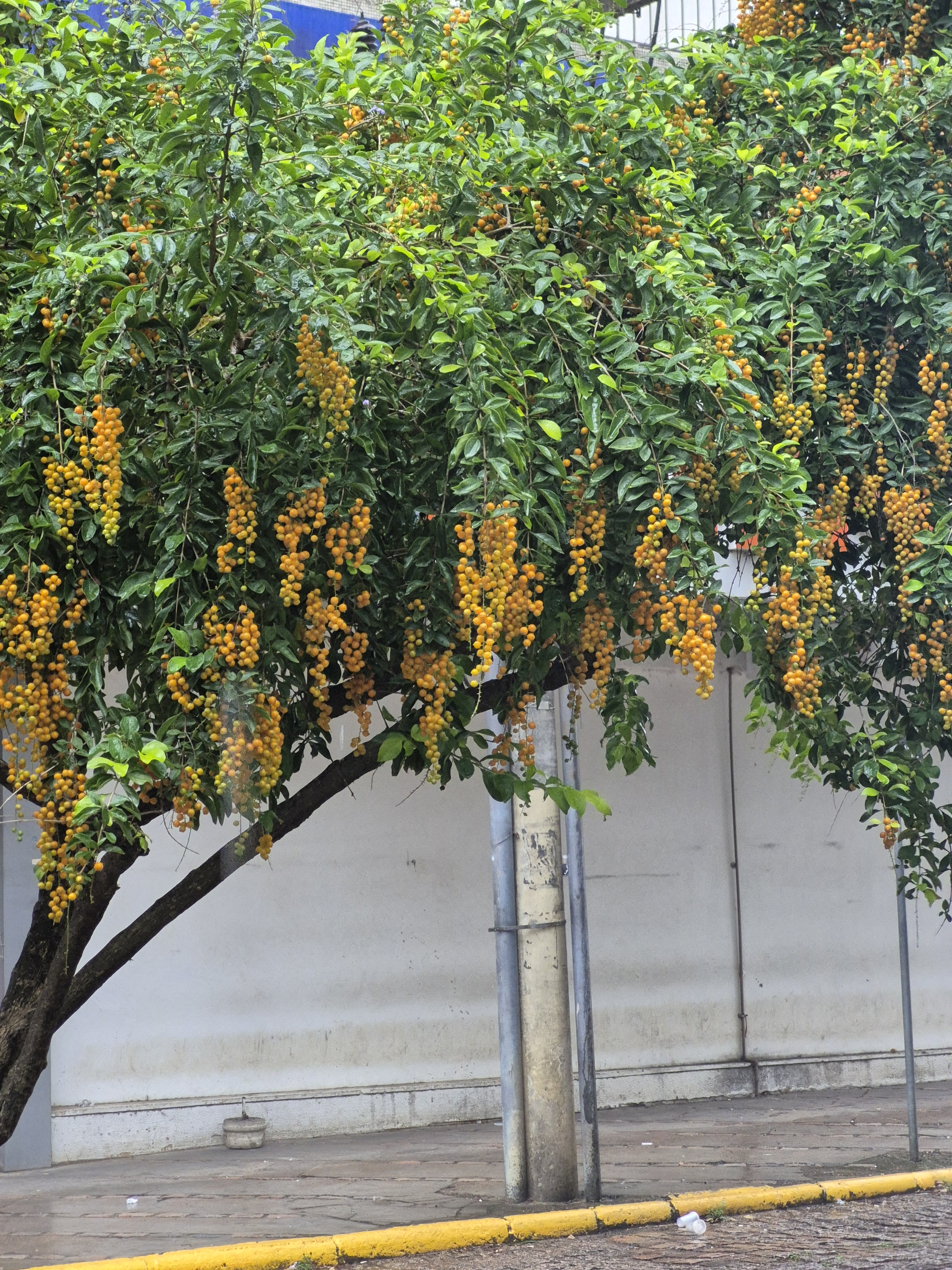
Tree with hanging fruits in Brazil

Golden dewdrop is widely grown as an ornamental plant throughout tropical and warm subtropical regions. Its showy flowers and fruit make it a desirable addition to gardens, and the blossoms attract butterflies and hummingbirds. There are a wide variety of cultivars available, including 'Alba', 'Aurea', 'Aussie Gold', 'Gold Mound', 'Geisha Girl', 'Sapphire Showers', and 'Variegata'.

=== Invasive potential ===
The plant has been identified as an invasive species in Australia, South Asia, China, South Africa, Hawaii, Fiji and French Polynesia. It has been introduced to other habitats but has not become invasive.

== Properties ==
The leaves and unripened berries of the plant are toxic, and are confirmed to have killed dogs and cats. However, songbirds eat the fruit without ill effects. Documented cases of toxicity in humans are sparse, with many secondary sources stating that children have died from consumption of the plant. This is likely attributable to an 1895 case of presumed poisoning by Duranta erecta (formerly Duranta plumieri) in a four year-old boy in Australia. From the original text:

"[A]bout 3:30 p.m. he said he felt very tired and sleepy. [...] His face was very flushed and the pupils dilated, while his lips and eyelids appeared swollen. [...] At 7 p.m. the boy had passed a large motion [sic] into the bed. This was sticky, ashy-grey in colour. [...] The tongue was coated with a dirty-grey fur, and the breath had the same offensive smell as the motions. The lips were slightly swollen and cracked, but not discoloured, and the tonsils and back of the pharynx were very red, but not swollen. [T]he conjunctivae were injected. [...] The pupils were dilated, very little iris being visible, and they were insensitive to light. [...] The temperature was 105.4 °F. [The] pulse was 200. About 5 a.m. he began to convulse, the spasms being tonic in character, with slight opisthotonos and marked retraction of the head. During the spasms the eyes were widely opened and the pupils less dilated, while the [facial muscles] did not participate in the general spasm, and the jaws were not tightly clenched. At 7 a.m. the temperature had fallen to 101 °F and the pulse to 160. [He vomited] inky-looking liquid material, the fluid part of which was colourless, and the solid portion like coffee grounds. The convulsive attacks now became more frequent and prolonged, [and] he died at 10:45 a.m. [A] small portion of [feces] passed about a quarter of an hour before death was scraped from the bed clothes and washed, when a number of partly digested berries of the Duranta plumieri was found in it. [...] I am not aware that the toxicology of Duranta has ever been investigated, but the symptoms described above, taken with the presence of berries in the motions, appear to bear the relation of effect and cause. If this is so, it would appear to be a poison of a cerebrospinal type [...]. It is of course dangerous to theorize too much on such a slender basis as a single case, and that but incompletely observed, but I think that the combination of circumstances described in the above report is a very strong piece of prima facie evidence for the conclusions arrived at."

Antioxidative coumarinolignoids called repenins have been isolated from Duranta erecta.

In the fruit, the alkaloid isoquinoline in addition to the monoterpenes durantoside I, durantoside, and repenoside have been identified. The leaves and fruits of D. repens contain a saponin glycoside and the presence of hydrocyanic acid. The durantoside has been detected in leaves and stems with leaves. The isoquinoline is lethal to insects.

== Gallery ==
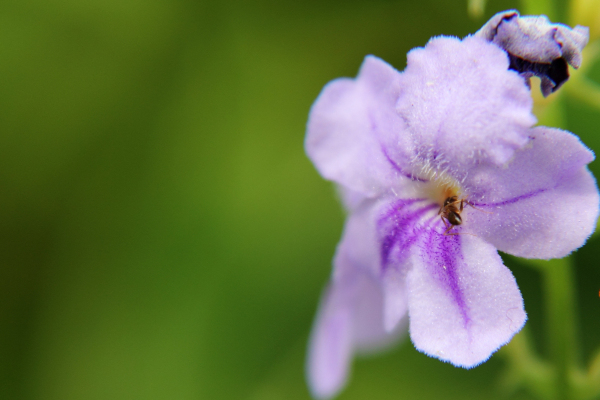
Duranta erecta

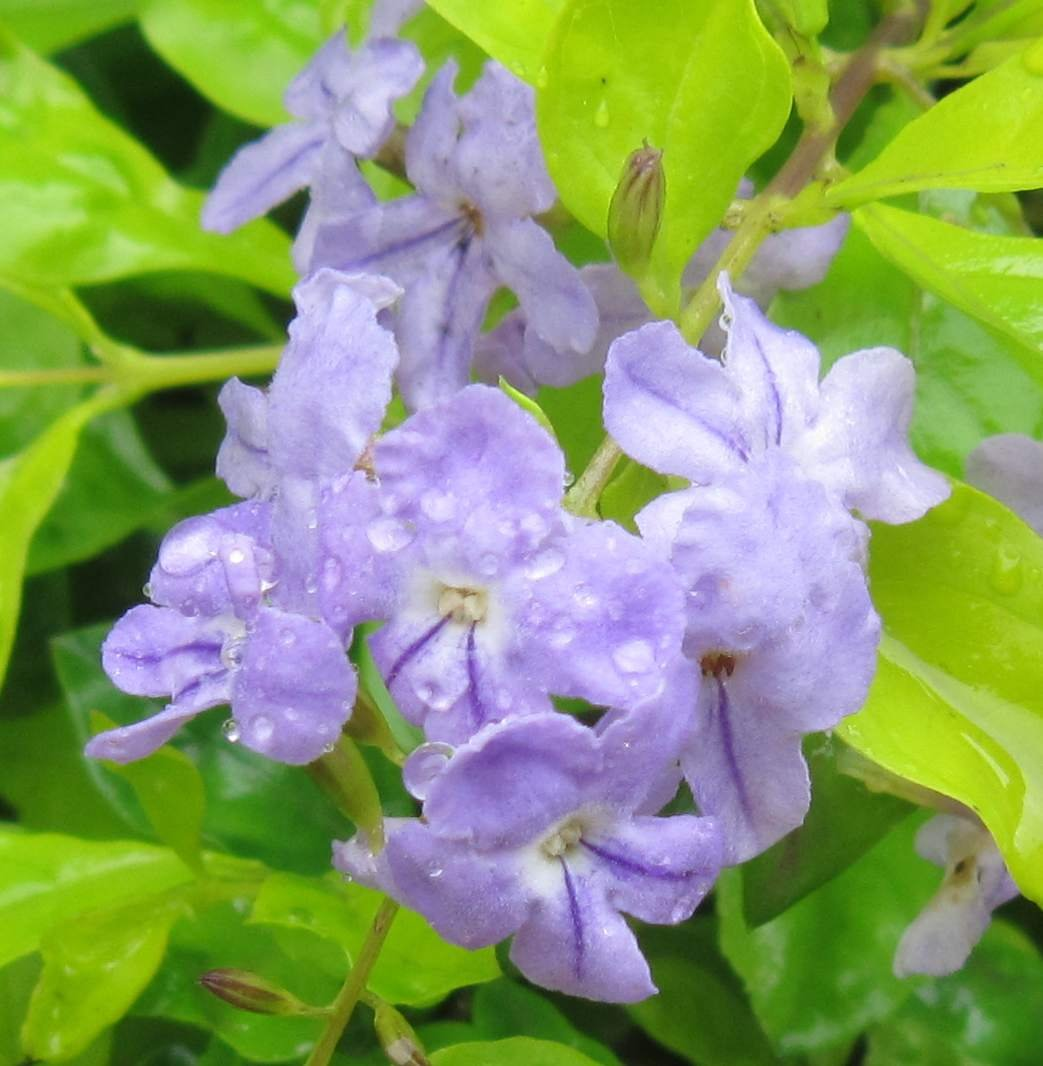
Duranta Flowers

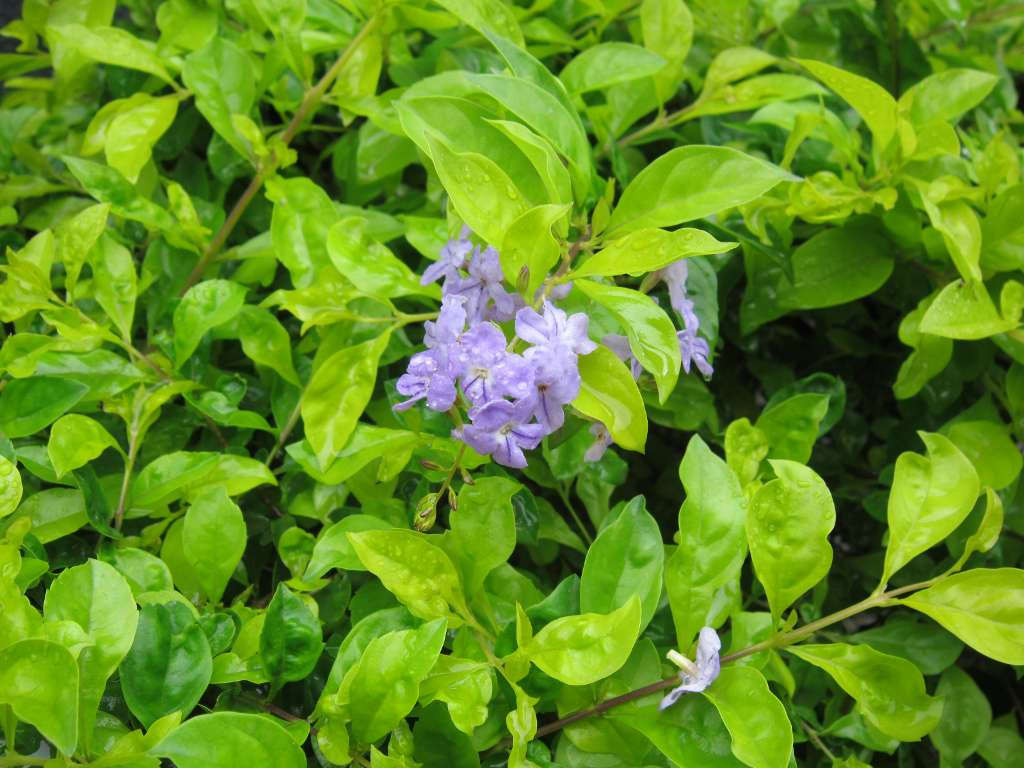
Duranta Bush

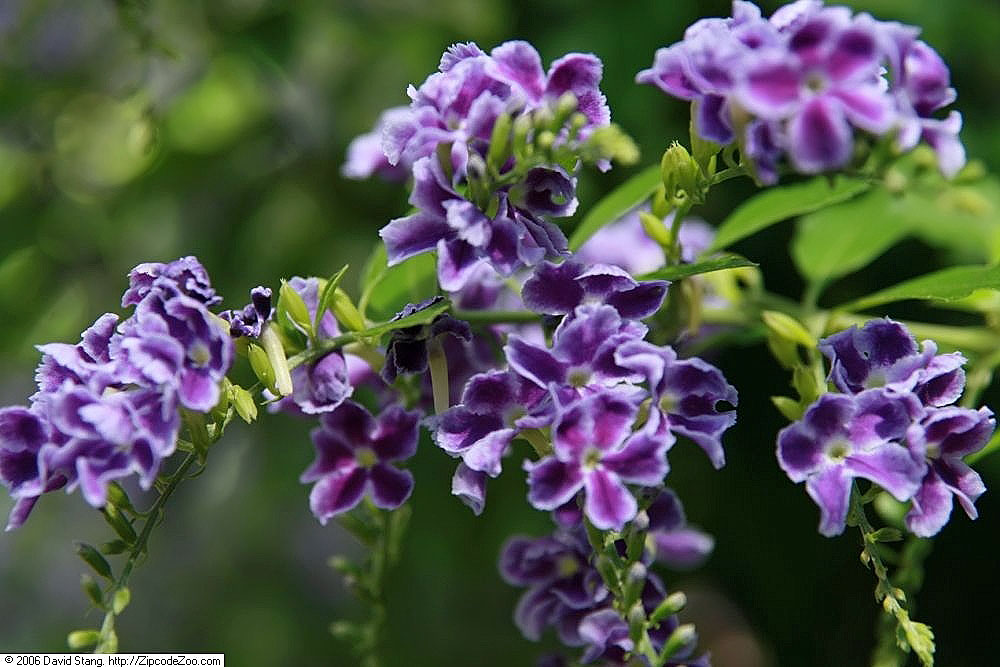
'Saphhire Blue' cultivar

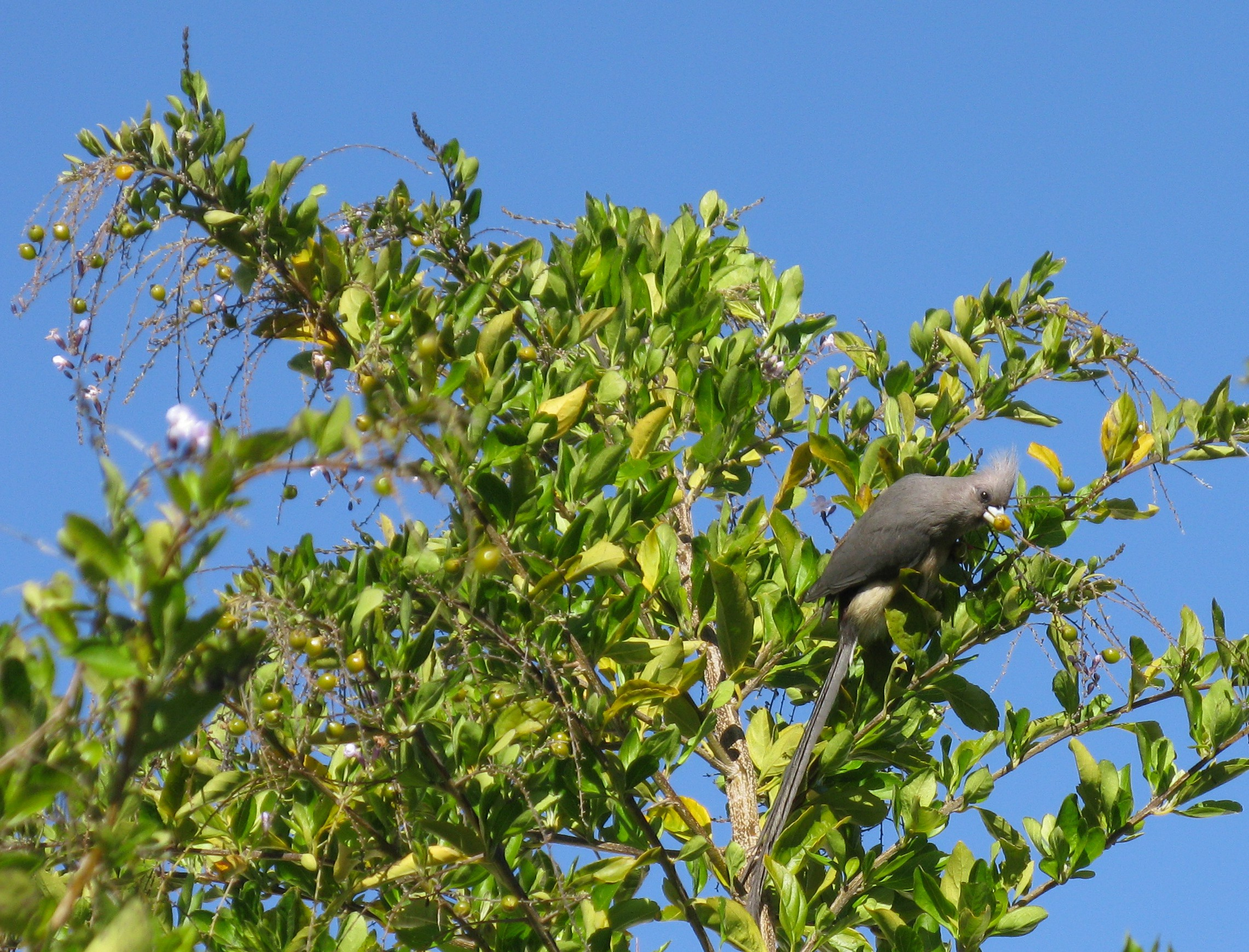
Mousebird feeding on fruit

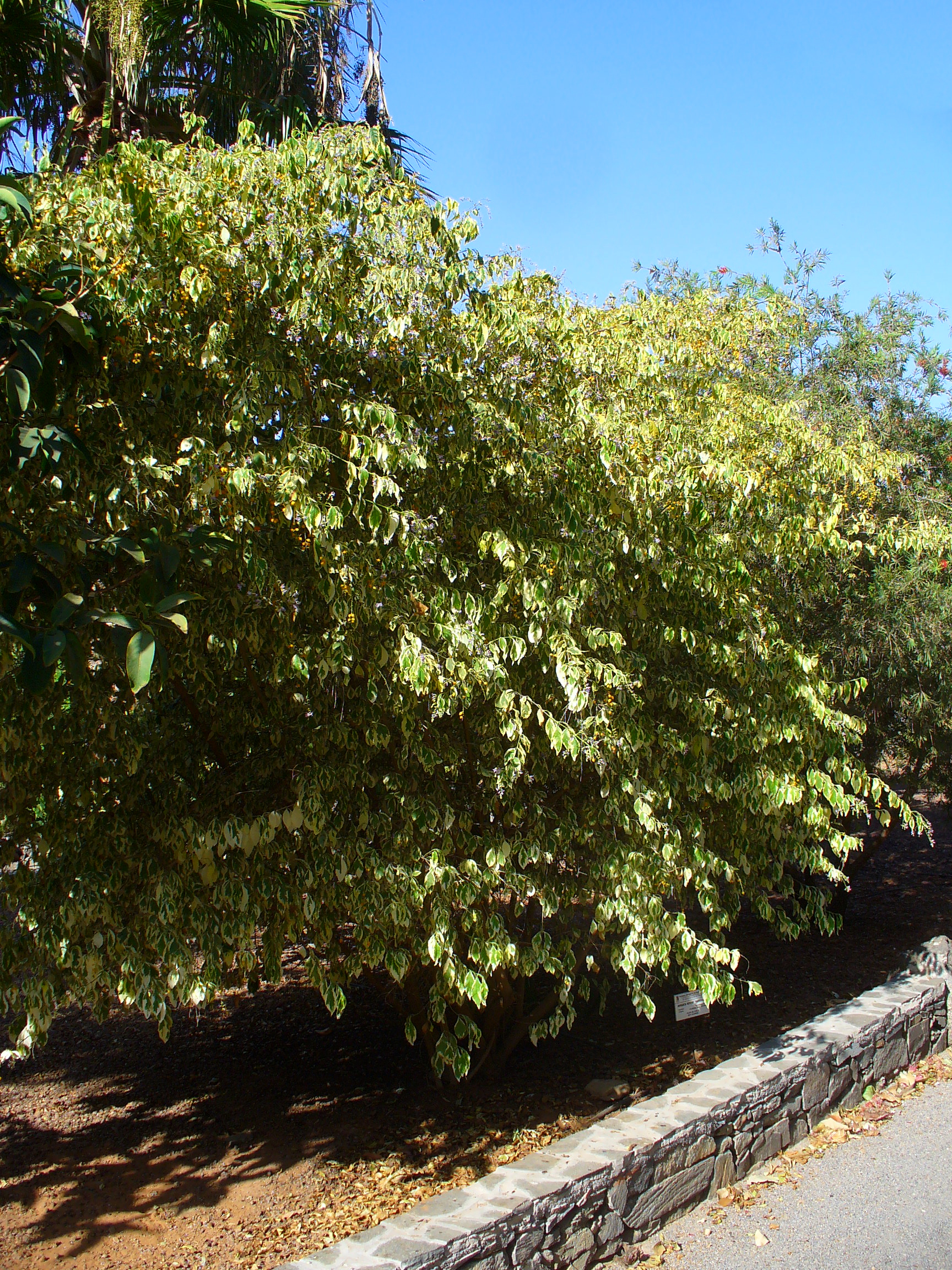
A large shrub

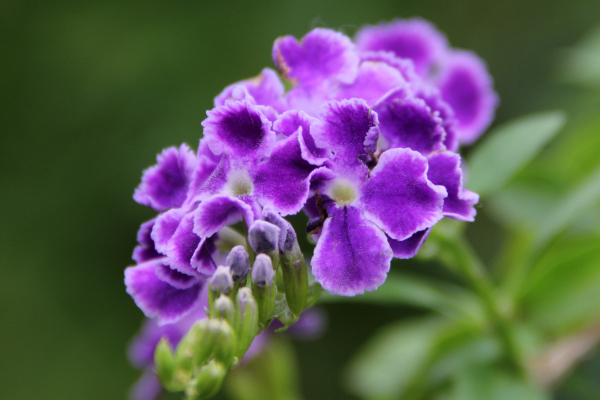
Flower closeup

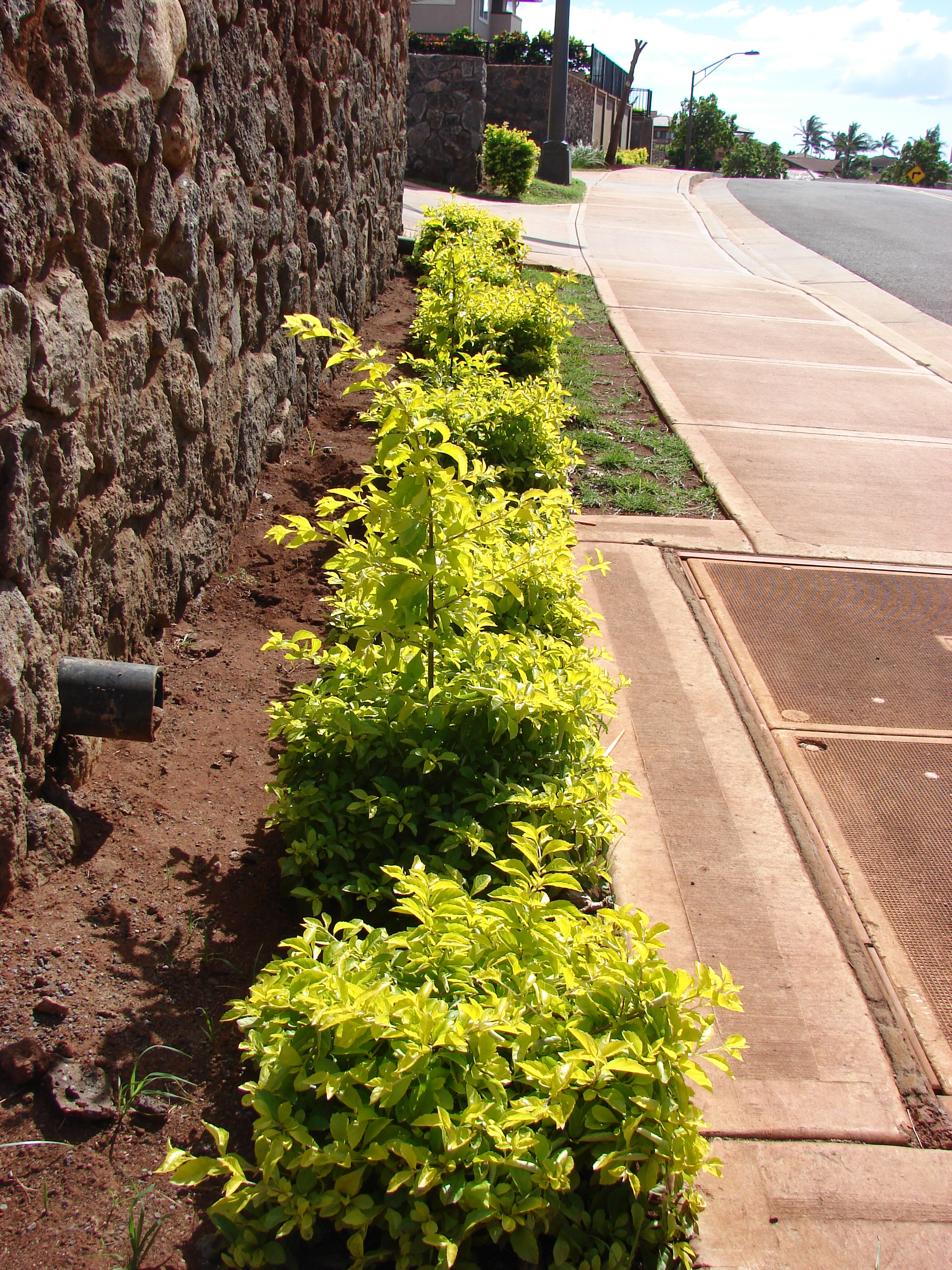
Small hedge

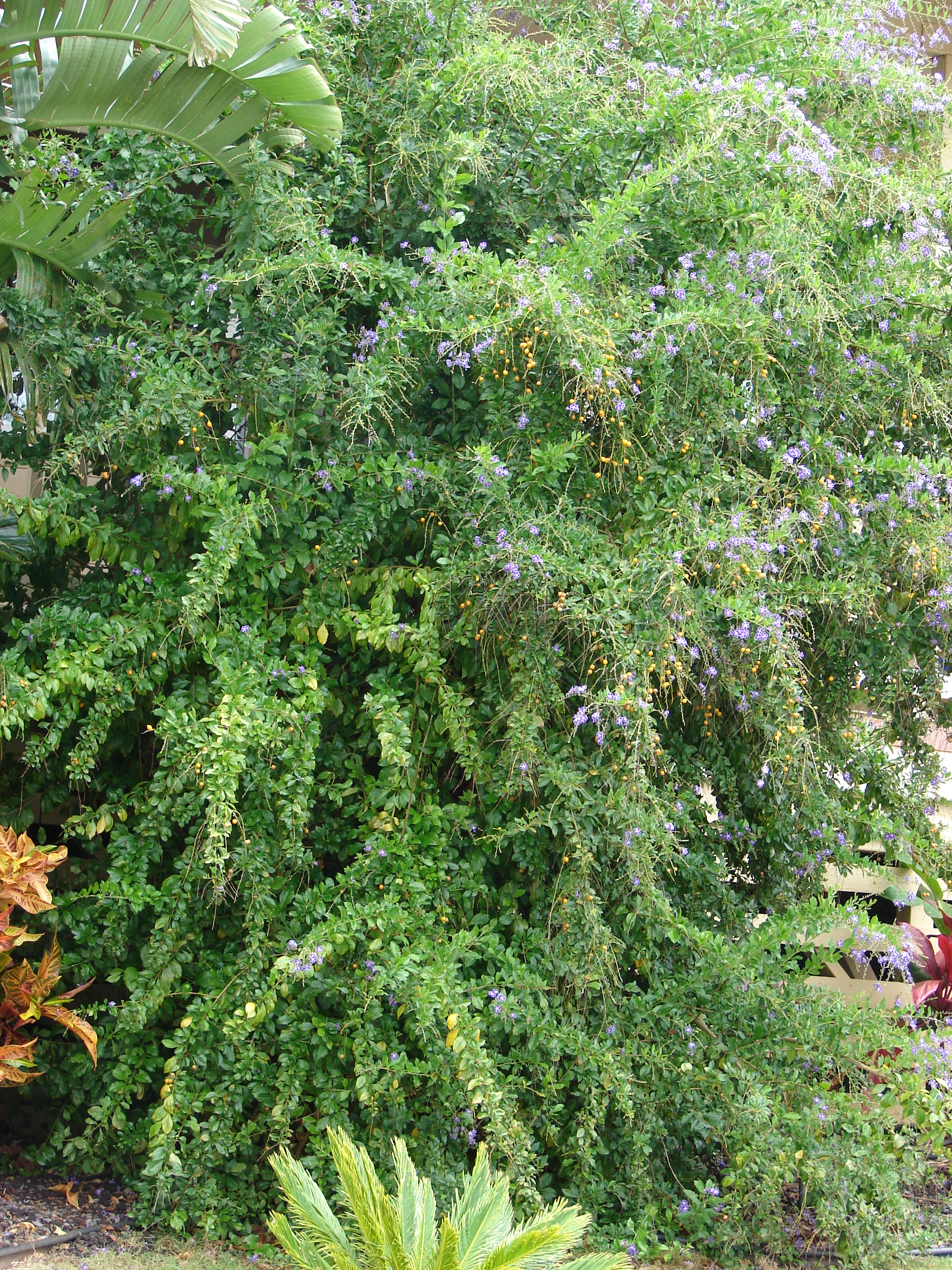
Grown as a small tree

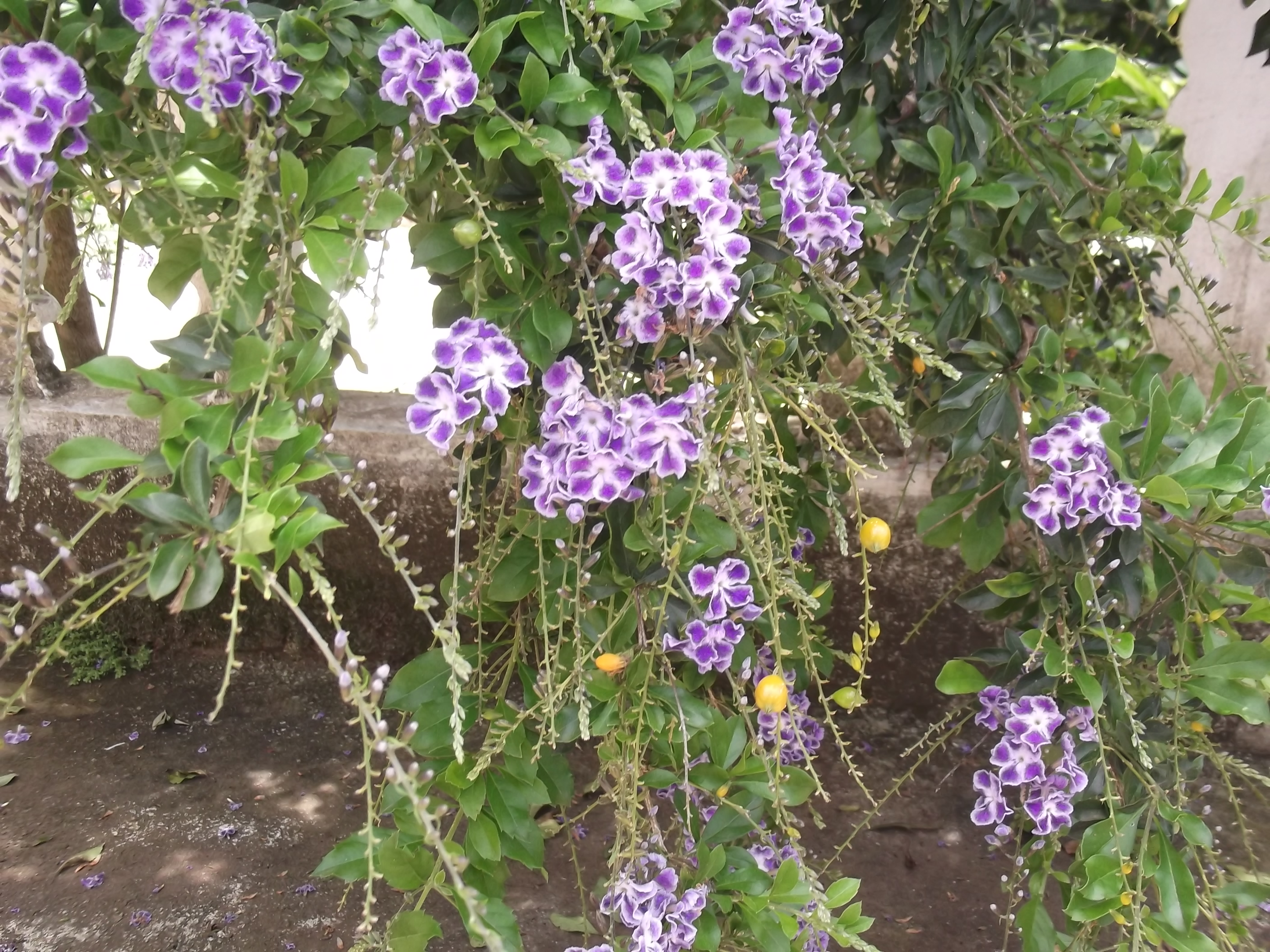
A sprawling shrub in India

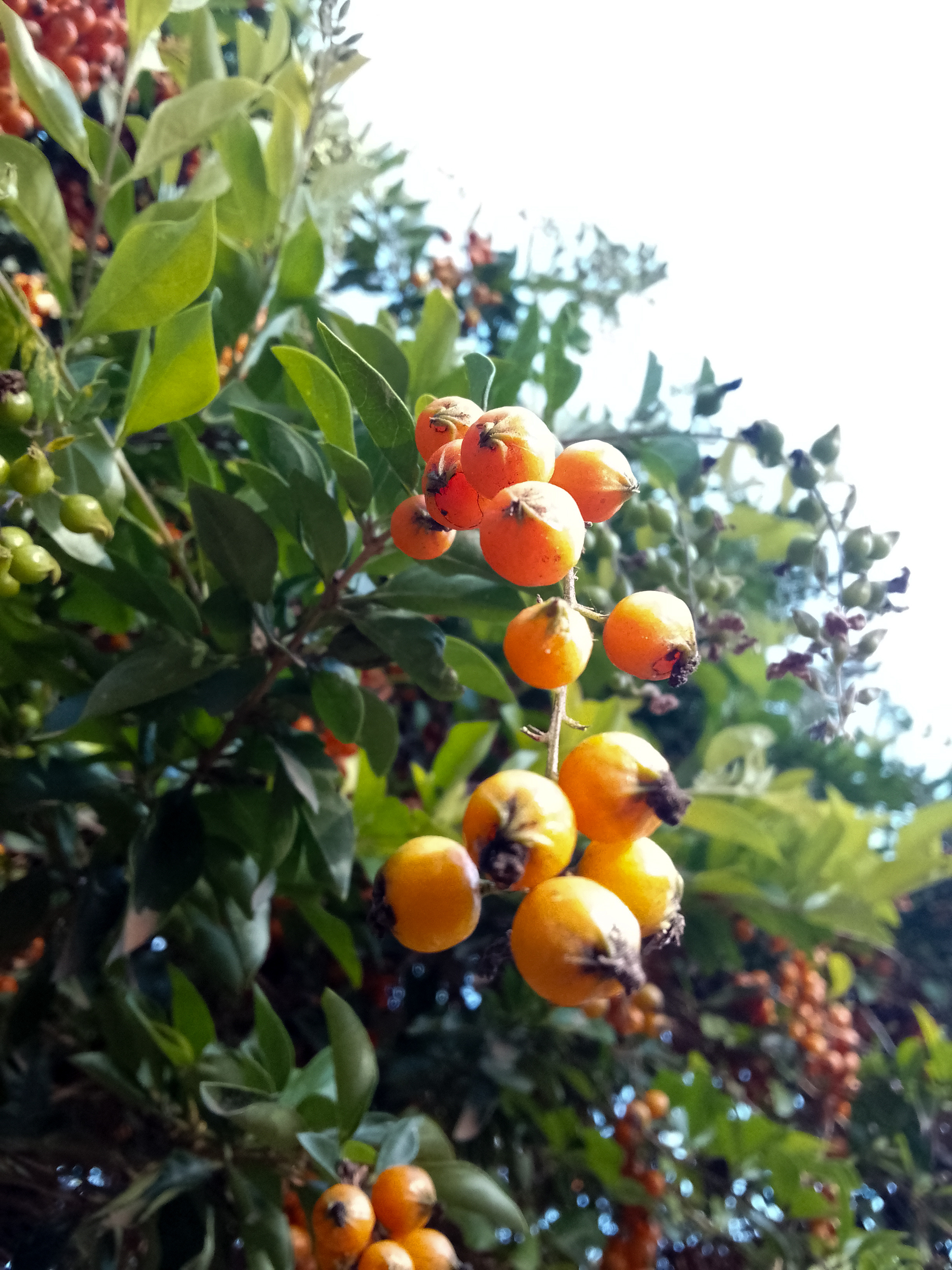
Fruits closeup
