= Cyclohexanol dehydrogenase =

cyclohexanol dehydrogenase

Identifiers
- EC no.: 1.1.1.245
- CAS no.: 63951-98-4

Databases
- IntEnz: IntEnz view
- BRENDA: BRENDA entry
- ExPASy: NiceZyme view
- KEGG: KEGG entry
- MetaCyc: metabolic pathway
- PRIAM: profile
- PDB structures: RCSB PDB PDBe PDBsum
- Gene Ontology: AmiGO / QuickGO
Search
- PMC: articles
- PubMed: articles
- NCBI: proteins

In enzymology, a cyclohexanol dehydrogenase (EC 1.1.1.245) is an enzyme that catalyzes the chemical reaction

cyclohexanol + NAD^{+} $\rightleftharpoons$ cyclohexanone + NADH + H^{+}

Thus, the two substrates of this enzyme are cyclohexanol and NAD^{+}, whereas its 3 products are cyclohexanone, NADH, and H^{+}.

This enzyme belongs to the family of oxidoreductases, specifically those acting on the CH-OH group of donor with NAD^{+} or NADP^{+} as acceptor. The systematic name of this enzyme class is cyclohexanol:NAD^{+} oxidoreductase. This enzyme participates in caprolactam degradation.
