= C7H12O4 =

The molecular formula C_{7}H_{12}O_{4} (molar mass: 160.17 g/mol, exact mass: 160.0736 u) may refer to:

- Diethyl malonate (DEM)
- Pimelic acid
