= Homoenolates =

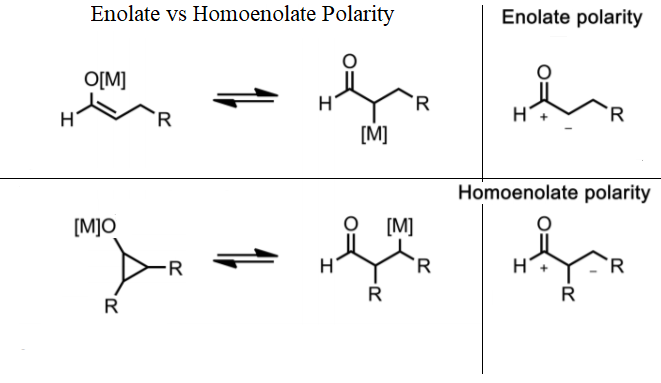

Homoenolates are a type of functional group that have been used in synthetic organic chemistry since the 1980s. They are related to enolates, but represent an umpolung of their reactivity. Homoenolates can be formed with a variety of different metal counterions, including lithium, iron, silver, lead, titanium, tin, tellurium, zirconium, niobium, mercury, zinc, antimony, bismuth, nickel, palladium, and copper. Homoenolates stability and reactivity varies by counterion identity and other nearby functional groups. Common pathways of decomposition include proto-demetalation and β-hydride elimination. Multiple reviews on the topic of homoenolates and their reactivity have been published.

== Homoenolates from cyclopropanols ==
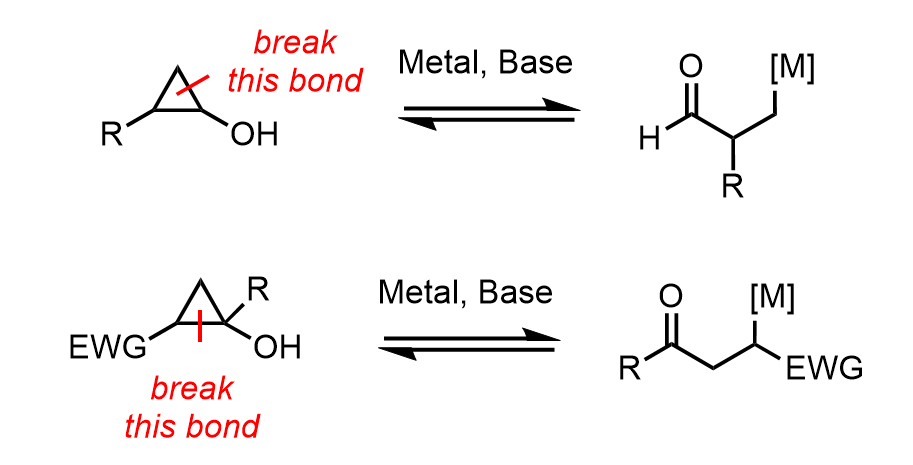
Chemical structures showing the regioselective ring-opening of cyclopropanols to generate homoenolates.

Homoenolates are typically derived from the ring-opening reaction of cyclopropanol derivatives in the presence of metal and base. The ring opening reaction of a substituted cyclopropanol typically results in the carbon-metal bond being formed on the less substituted position (except if the cyclopropane is substituted with electron withdrawing substituents, in which case the carbon-metal bond forms at the alpha position to the electron withdrawing group.)
