= Pimeloyl chloride =

Names
- Preferred IUPAC name Heptanedioyl dichloride

Identifiers
CAS Number	142-79-0
3D model (JSmol)	Interactive image
ChemSpider	60672
ECHA InfoCard	100.005.056
EC Number	205-561-7
PubChem CID	67341
UNII	NTY2DS4AQP
CompTox Dashboard (EPA)	DTXSID7059721
- InChI: InChI=1S/C7H10Cl2O2/c8-6(10)4-2-1-3-5-7(9)11/h1-5H2 Key: LVIMBOHJGMDKEJ-UHFFFAOYSA-N
- SMILES: C(CCC(=O)Cl)CCC(=O)Cl

Properties
Chemical formula	C_{7}H_{10}Cl_{2}O_{2}
Molar mass	197.06 g·mol^{−1}

Hazards
- GHS labelling
Pictograms	(GHS05: Corrosive) (GHS07: Exclamation mark)
Signal word	Danger
Hazard statements	H315, H318, H335
Precautionary statements	P260, P264, P271, P280, P301+P330+P331, P303+P361+P353, P304+P340, P305+P351+P338, P310, P312, P321, P363, P403+P233, P405, P501
- Except where otherwise noted, data are given for materials in their standard state (at 25 °C [77 °F], 100 kPa). Infobox references

Pimeloyl chloride is a di-acyl chloride. It is used as a reagent in organic synthesis.

== Synthesis ==
Pimeloyl chloride can be synthesized from pimelic acid in thionyl chloride.
