= 6-oxohexanoate dehydrogenase =

Class of enzymes

Identifiers
- EC no.: 1.2.1.63

Databases
- IntEnz: IntEnz view
- BRENDA: BRENDA entry
- ExPASy: NiceZyme view
- KEGG: KEGG entry
- MetaCyc: metabolic pathway
- PRIAM: profile
- PDB structures: RCSB PDB PDBe PDBsum
- Gene Ontology: AmiGO / QuickGO
Search
- PMC: articles
- PubMed: articles
- NCBI: proteins

In enzymology, 6-oxohexanoate dehydrogenase (EC 1.2.1.63) is an enzyme that catalyzes the chemical reaction

6-oxohexanoic acid
+ NADP^{+}
H_{2}O
H^{+}
H_{2}O
H^{+}
adipic acid
+ NADPH

The three substrates of this enzyme are 6-oxohexanoic acid, oxidised nicotinamide adenine dinucleotide phosphate (NADP^{+}), and water. Its products are adipic acid, reduced NADPH, and a proton.

This enzyme belongs to the family of oxidoreductases, specifically those acting on the aldehyde or oxo group of donor with NAD+ or NADP+ as acceptor. The systematic name of this enzyme class is 6-oxohexanoate:NADP+ oxidoreductase. This enzyme is involved in cyclohexanol degradation in Acinetobacter.
