= Cyclopentanol dehydrogenase =

cyclopentanol dehydrogenase

Identifiers
- EC no.: 1.1.1.163
- CAS no.: 37364-12-8

Databases
- IntEnz: IntEnz view
- BRENDA: BRENDA entry
- ExPASy: NiceZyme view
- KEGG: KEGG entry
- MetaCyc: metabolic pathway
- PRIAM: profile
- PDB structures: RCSB PDB PDBe PDBsum
- Gene Ontology: AmiGO / QuickGO
Search
- PMC: articles
- PubMed: articles
- NCBI: proteins

In enzymology, cyclopentanol dehydrogenase (EC 1.1.1.163) is an enzyme that catalyzes the chemical reaction

cyclopentanol
+ NAD^{+}
H^{+}
H^{+}
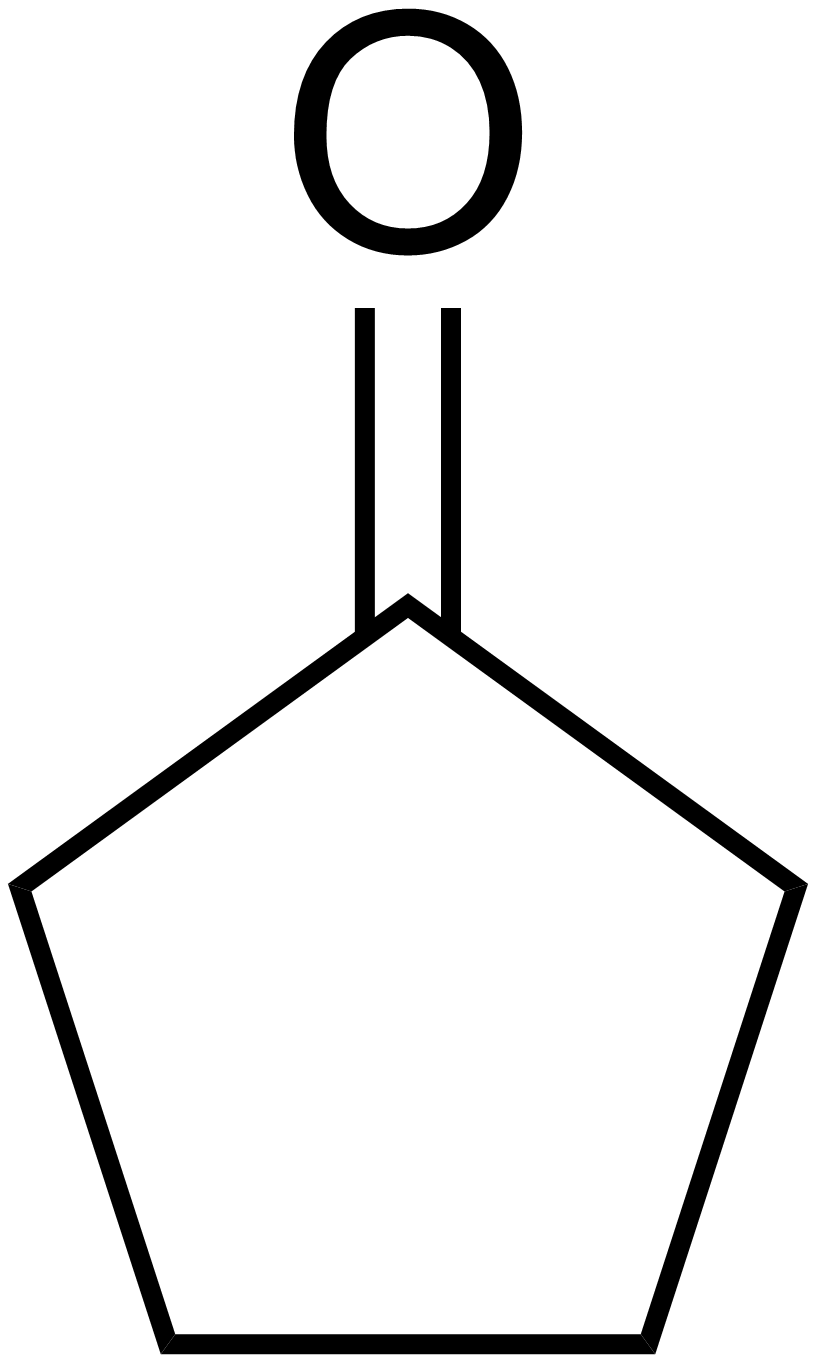
cyclopentanone
+ NADH

The two substrates of this enzyme are cyclopentanol and oxidised nicotinamide adenine dinucleotide (NAD^{+}). Its products are cyclopentanone, reduced NADH, and a proton.

This enzyme belongs to the family of oxidoreductases, specifically those acting on the CH-OH group of donor with NAD^{+} or NADP^{+} as acceptor. The systematic name of this enzyme class is cyclopentanol:NAD^{+} oxidoreductase.
