= Cycloheptanol =

Names
- IUPAC name Cycloheptanol
- Other names: Cycloheptyl alcohol; Hydroxycycloheptane; Suberyl alcohol; Suberol

Identifiers
CAS Number	502-41-0
3D model (JSmol)	Interactive image
ChEMBL	ChEMBL503332
ChemSpider	9970
ECHA InfoCard	100.007.215
EC Number	207-936-0
PubChem CID	10399
CompTox Dashboard (EPA)	DTXSID5074713
- InChI: InChI=1S/C7H14O/c8-7-5-3-1-2-4-6-7/h7-8H,1-6H2 Key: QCRFMSUKWRQZEM-UHFFFAOYSA-N
- SMILES: C1CCCCCC1O

Properties
Chemical formula	C_{7}H_{13}OH
Molar mass	114.188 g·mol^{−1}
Appearance	Colorless oily liquid
Odor	Mild, sweet, alcoholic, pleasant
Density	0.948 g/cm^{3}
Melting point	7.15 °C (44.87 °F; 280.30 K)
Boiling point	185 °C (365 °F; 458 K)
Solubility in water	Practically insoluble
Solubility	High solubility and miscibility with many organic solvents. Chloroform (sparingly), methanol (slightly).
Refractive index (n_{D})	1.48

Hazards
- GHS labelling
Pictograms	(GHS02: Flammable)
Signal word	Warning
Hazard statements	H226
Precautionary statements	P210, P233, P240, P241, P242, P243, P280, P303+P361+P353, P370+P378, P403+P235, P501
Flash point	64 °C (147 °F; 337 K)

Related compounds
Related compounds	Cyclopropanol; Cyclobutanol; Cyclopentanol; Cyclohexanol; Cyclooctanol; Cycloheptanone
- Except where otherwise noted, data are given for materials in their standard state (at 25 °C [77 °F], 100 kPa). Infobox references

Cycloheptanol is the organic compound with the chemical formula (CH_{2})_{6}CHOH or C_{7}H_{13}OH. It is a colorless oily liquid with mild, sweet alcoholic odor. The molecule is related to 7-membered cycloheptane ring in which one of its hydrogen atoms is replaced by a hydroxyl group.

== Synthesis ==
Cycloheptanol can be synthesized by reduction of cycloheptanone.

== Properties ==
Cycloheptanol molecule consists of a large nonpolar hydrophobic 7-membered hydrocarbon ring (−C_{7}H_{13}) (which is contributing to cycloheptanol's practical insolubility in water), with a polar hydrophilic hydroxyl group (−OH) attached to it.

Solid cycloheptanol shows polymorphism at low temperatures. Four phases are discovered: phase I, II, III and IV. Phases I and II are orientationally disordered. Phases III and IV are orthorhombic. The phase transition temperatures are: from liquid phase to phase I 7.15 °C (44.87 °F) (melting point), from phase I to phase II −14.70 °C (5.54 °F), from phase II to phase III −45.89 °C (−50.60 °F).

== Uses ==
It is used in organic synthesis, as a solvent and as an intermediate in the production of various chemicals.

== Safety ==
Cycloheptanol is a flammable chemical, difficult to ignite. Vapors can form explosive mixtures with air on intense heating, and are 3.94 times heavier than air, thus, they may spread along floors. It reacts violently with strong oxidising agents and acid anhydrides. When on fire, it emits toxic gases of carbon monoxide and carbon dioxide. Keep away from open flames, hot surfaces and sources of ignition. Precautionary measures against static discharge must be taken.
