= 1,1'-Dihydroxydicyclohexyl peroxide =

1,1′-Dihydroxydicyclohexyl peroxide

Names
- Preferred IUPAC name 1,1′-Peroxydi(cyclohexan-1-ol)
- Other names Bis(1-hydroxycyclohexyl) peroxide

Identifiers
CAS Number	2407-94-5
3D model (JSmol)	Interactive image
ChemSpider	68006
EC Number	219-306-2
PubChem CID	75477
UNII	7XR9J84XLH
UN number	3106
CompTox Dashboard (EPA)	DTXSID6062389
- InChI: InChI=1S/C12H22O4/c13-11(7-3-1-4-8-11)15-16-12(14)9-5-2-6-10-12/h13-14H,1-10H2 Key: ZPOUDMYDJJMHOO-UHFFFAOYSA-N
- SMILES: C1CCC(CC1)(O)OOC2(CCCCC2)O

Properties
Chemical formula	C_{12}H_{22}O_{4}
Molar mass	230.304 g·mol^{−1}
Appearance	white solid
Melting point	66–68 °C (151–154 °F; 339–341 K)

Hazards
- GHS labelling
Pictograms	(GHS01: Explosive) (GHS05: Corrosive) (GHS07: Exclamation mark)
Signal word	Danger
Hazard statements	H240, H302, H314
Precautionary statements	P210, P220, P234, P260, P264, P270, P280, P301+P312, P301+P330+P331, P303+P361+P353, P304+P340, P305+P351+P338, P310, P321, P330, P363, P370+P378, P370+P380+P375, P403+P235, P405, P411, P420, P501
- Except where otherwise noted, data are given for materials in their standard state (at 25 °C [77 °F], 100 kPa). Infobox references

1,1′-Dihydroxydicyclohexyl peroxide is an organic compound with the formula (C_{6}H_{10}OH)_{2}O_{2}. It is one of the peroxides derived from the reaction of cyclohexanone and hydrogen peroxide. Upon treatment with acid and additional peroxide, it converts to the cyclic diperoxide, bis(cyclohexylidene peroxide), (C_{6}H_{10})_{2}(O_{2})_{2}.

1,1′-Dihydroxydicyclohexyl peroxide is a catalyst for radical-initiated vulcanization.
