= (1-hydroxycyclohexan-1-yl)acetyl-CoA lyase =

Class of enzymes

Identifiers
- EC no.: 4.1.3.35
- CAS no.: 71343-09-4

Databases
- IntEnz: IntEnz view
- BRENDA: BRENDA entry
- ExPASy: NiceZyme view
- KEGG: KEGG entry
- MetaCyc: metabolic pathway
- PRIAM: profile
- PDB structures: RCSB PDB PDBe PDBsum
- Gene Ontology: AmiGO / QuickGO
Search
- PMC: articles
- PubMed: articles
- NCBI: proteins

The enzyme (1-hydroxycyclohexan-1-yl)acetyl-CoA lyase (EC 4.1.3.35) catalyzes the chemical reaction

(1-hydroxycyclohexan-1-yl)acetyl-CoA $\rightleftharpoons$ acetyl-CoA + cyclohexanone

Hence, this enzyme has one substrate, (1-hydroxycyclohexan-1-yl)acetyl-CoA, and two products, acetyl-CoA and cyclohexanone.

This enzyme belongs to the family of lyases, specifically the oxo-acid-lyases, which cleave carbon-carbon bonds. The systematic name of this enzyme class is (1-hydroxycyclohexan-1-yl)acetyl-CoA cyclohexanone-lyase (acetyl-CoA-forming). This enzyme is also called (1-hydroxycyclohexan-1-yl)acetyl-CoA cyclohexanone-lyase.
