= Sodium benzenesulfonate =

Identifiers
CAS Number	515-42-4
3D model (JSmol)	Interactive image
ChemSpider	10139
DrugBank	DB7350000
ECHA InfoCard	100.007.454
EC Number	208-198-2
PubChem CID	517327
UNII	K5RM14AZHX
CompTox Dashboard (EPA)	DTXSID4060157
- InChI: InChI=1S/C6H6O3S.Na/c7-10(8,9)6-4-2-1-3-5-6;/h1-5H,(H,7,8,9);/q;+1/p-1 Key: MZSDGDXXBZSFTG-UHFFFAOYSA-M
- SMILES: C1=CC=C(C=C1)S(=O)(=O)[O-].[Na+]

Properties
Chemical formula	C_{6}H_{5}NaO_{3}S
Molar mass	180.15 g·mol^{−1}
Appearance	white solid
Melting point	450 °C (842 °F; 723 K) decomposition
- Except where otherwise noted, data are given for materials in their standard state (at 25 °C [77 °F], 100 kPa). Infobox references

Sodium benzenesulfonate is an organic compound with the formula C_{6}H_{5}SO_{3}Na. It is white, water-soluble solid, It is produced by the neutralization benzenesulfonic acid with sodium hydroxide. It is also a common ingredient in some detergents. The compound typically crystallizes from water as the monohydrate.

Heating this salt in strong base results in desulfonation, giving, after acid workup, phenol This reaction was at one time, the principal route to phenol.
