= Cycloheptanone =

Names
- Preferred IUPAC name Cycloheptanone
- Other names Suberone

Identifiers
CAS Number	502-42-1
3D model (JSmol)	Interactive image
ChEMBL	ChEMBL18607
ChemSpider	9971
ECHA InfoCard	100.007.216
EC Number	207-937-6
PubChem CID	10400
UNII	QH80295937
CompTox Dashboard (EPA)	DTXSID8060113
- InChI: InChI=1S/C7H12O/c8-7-5-3-1-2-4-6-7/h1-6H2 Key: CGZZMOTZOONQIA-UHFFFAOYSA-N
- SMILES: O=C1CCCCCC1

Properties
Chemical formula	C_{7}H_{12}O
Molar mass	112.172 g·mol^{−1}
Appearance	Colorless liquid
Density	0.949 g/cm^{3} (20 °C)
Boiling point	179 to 181 °C (354 to 358 °F; 452 to 454 K)
Solubility in water	Insoluble

Hazards
- GHS labelling
Pictograms	(GHS02: Flammable) (GHS05: Corrosive) (GHS07: Exclamation mark)
Signal word	Danger
Hazard statements	H226, H302, H318
Precautionary statements	P210, P233, P240, P241, P242, P243, P264, P270, P280, P301+P312, P303+P361+P353, P305+P351+P338, P310, P330, P370+P378, P403+P235, P501
Flash point	56 °C (133 °F; 329 K)

Related compounds
Related cyclic ketones	Cyclohexanone, Cyclooctanone, Tropinone
- Except where otherwise noted, data are given for materials in their standard state (at 25 °C [77 °F], 100 kPa). verify (what is ?) Infobox references

Cycloheptanone, (CH_{2})_{6}CO, is a cyclic ketone also referred to as suberone. It is a colourless volatile liquid. Cycloheptanone is used as a precursor for the synthesis of pharmaceuticals.

== Synthesis ==
In 1836, French chemist Jean-Baptiste Boussingault first synthesized cycloheptanone from the calcium salt of dibasic suberic acid. The ketonization of calcium suberate yields calcium carbonate and suberone:

Ca(O_{2}C(CH_{2})_{6}CO_{2}) → CaCO_{3} + (CH_{2})_{6}CO

Cycloheptanone is still produced by the cyclization and decarboxylation of suberic acid or suberic acid esters. This reaction is typically conducted in the gas phase at 400–450 °C over alumina doped with zinc oxide or cerium oxide.

Cycloheptanone is also produced by the reaction of cyclohexanone with sodium ethoxide and nitromethane. The resulting sodium salt of 1-(nitromethyl)cyclohexanol is added to acetic acid and shaken with hydrogen gas in the presence of W-4 Raney nickel catalyst. Sodium nitrite and acetic acid are then added to give cycloheptanone.

Cycloheptanone is also prepared by ring expansion of cyclohexanone with diazomethane as the methylene source.

== Uses and reactions ==
Cycloheptanone is a precursor to bencyclane, a spasmolytic agent and vasodilator. Pimelic acid is produced by the oxidative cleavage of cycloheptanone. Dicarboxylic acids such as pimelic acid are useful for the preparation of fragrances and certain polymers.

Several microorganisms, including Mucor plumbeus, Mucor racemosus, and Penicillium chrysogenum, have been found to reduce cycloheptanone to cycloheptanol. These microorganisms have been investigated for use in certain stereospecific enzymatic reactions.

Suberone has demonstrated uses in the synthesis of bencyclane, ciclafrine, heptabarb, iprindole, heptolamide, stirocainide & Wy-28342.
