= Phenol =

Chemical compound

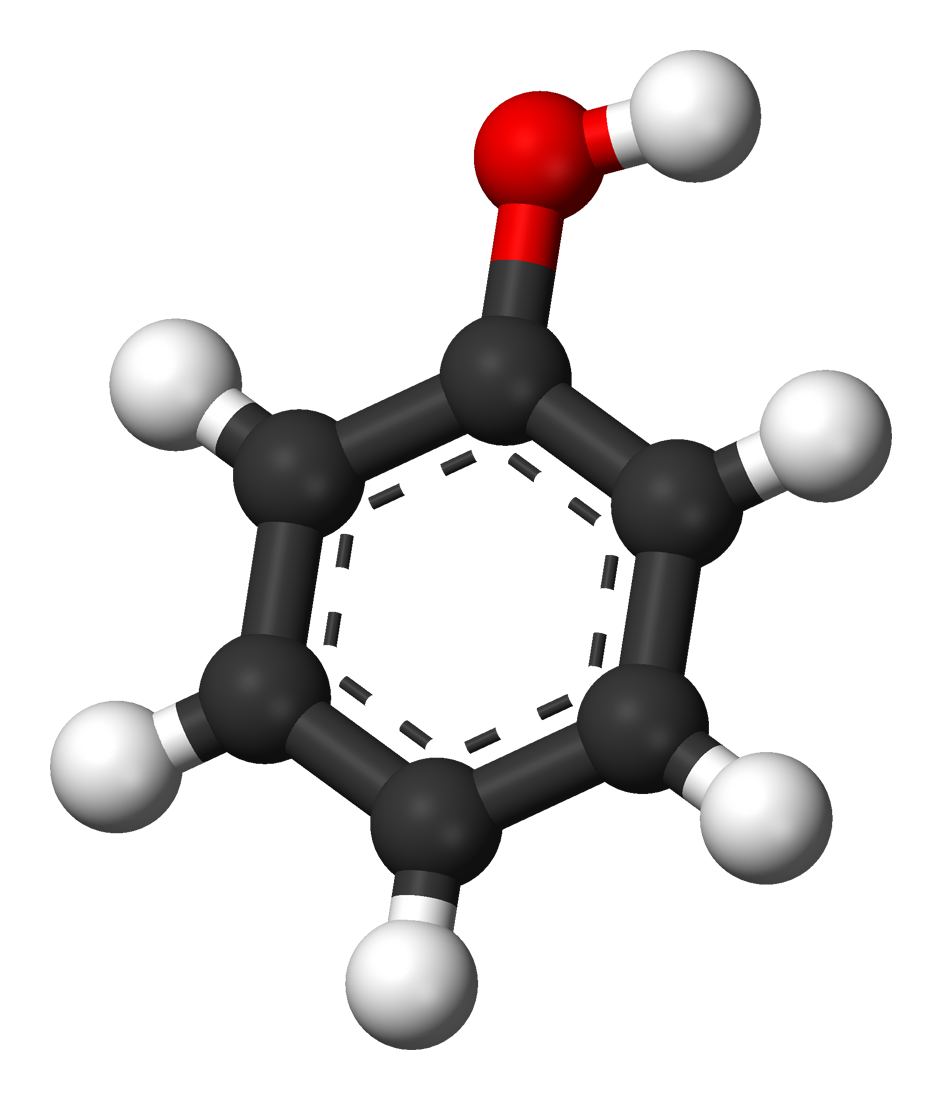

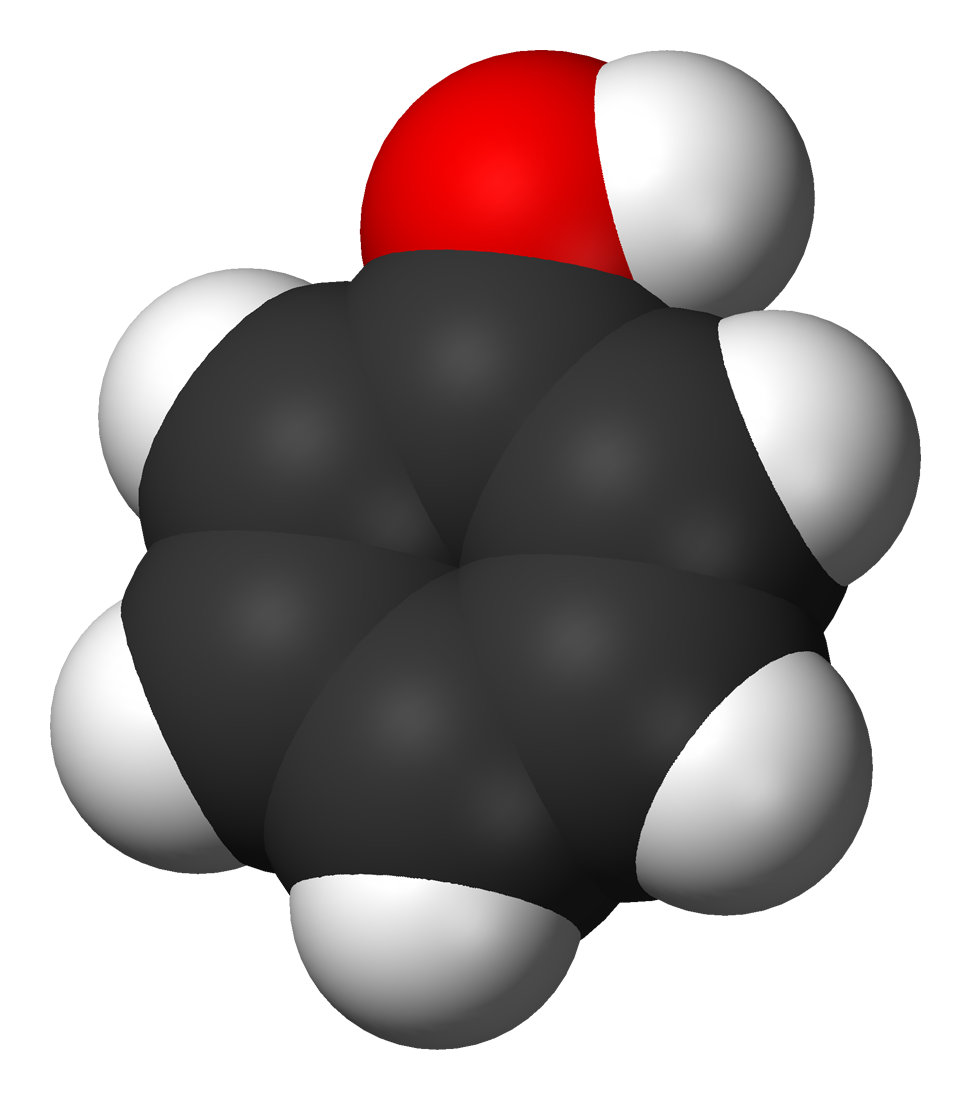

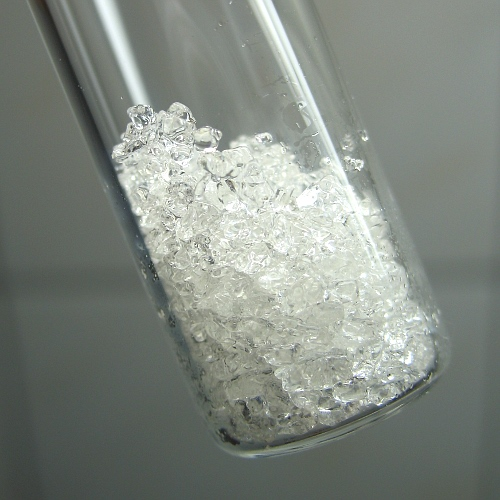

Names
- Preferred IUPAC name Phenol
- Systematic IUPAC name Benzenol
- Other names: Carbolic acid; Phenolic acid; Phenylic acid; Hydroxybenzene; Phenic acid; Phenyl alcohol; Phenyl hydroxide

Identifiers
| CAS Number | 108-95-2 |
| 3D model (JSmol) | Interactive image |
| Abbreviations | PhOH |
| ChEBI | CHEBI:15882 |
| ChEMBL | ChEMBL14060 |
| ChemSpider | 971 |
| DrugBank | DB03255 |
| ECHA InfoCard | 100.003.303 |
| KEGG | D00033 |
| PubChem CID | 996 |
| RTECS number | SJ3325000 |
| UNII | 339NCG44TV |
| UN number | 2821 (solution); 2312 (molten); 1671 (solid) |
| CompTox Dashboard (EPA) | DTXSID5021124 |
- InChI: InChI=1S/C6H6O/c7-6-4-2-1-3-5-6/h1-5,7H Key: ISWSIDIOOBJBQZ-UHFFFAOYSA-N; InChI=1/C6H6O/c7-6-4-2-1-3-5-6/h1-5,7H
- SMILES: C1=CC=C(C=C1)O

Properties
| Chemical formula | C_{6}H_{6}O |
| Molar mass | 94.113 g·mol^{−1} |
| Appearance | Transparent crystalline solid |
| Odor | Sweet and tarry |
| Density | 1.07 g/cm^{3} |
| Melting point | 40.5 °C (104.9 °F; 313.6 K) |
| Boiling point | 181.7 °C (359.1 °F; 454.8 K) |
| Solubility in water | 8.3 g/100 mL (20 °C) |
| log P | 1.48 |
| Vapor pressure | 0.4 mmHg (20 °C) |
| Acidity (pK_{a}) | 9.95 (in water), 18.0 (in DMSO), 29.1 (in acetonitrile) |
| Conjugate base | Phenoxide |
| UV-vis (λ_{max}) | 270.75 nm |
| Dipole moment | 1.224 D |

Pharmacology
| ATC code | C05BB05 (WHO) D08AE03 (WHO), N01BX03 (WHO), R02AA19 (WHO) |

Hazards
- GHS labelling
| Pictograms | (GHS05: Corrosive) (GHS06: Toxic) (GHS08: Health hazard) |
| Signal word | Danger |
| Hazard statements | H301, H311, H314, H331, H341, H373 |
| Precautionary statements | P261, P280, P301+P310, P305+P351+P338, P310 |
| NFPA 704 (fire diamond) | 3 2 0 |
| Flash point | 79 °C (174 °F; 352 K) |
| Explosive limits | 1.8–8.6% |
- Lethal dose or concentration (LD, LC)
| LD_{50} (median dose) | 317 mg/kg (rat, oral); 270 mg/kg (mouse, oral) |
| LD_{Lo} (lowest published) | 420 mg/kg (rabbit, oral); 500 mg/kg (dog, oral); 80 mg/kg (cat, oral) |
| LC_{50} (median concentration) | 19 ppm (mammal); 81 ppm (rat); 69 ppm (mouse) |
- NIOSH (US health exposure limits)
| PEL (Permissible) | TWA 5 ppm (19 mg/m^{3}) [skin] |
| REL (Recommended) | TWA 5 ppm (19 mg/m^{3}); C 15.6 ppm (60 mg/m^{3}) [15-minute] [skin] |
| IDLH (Immediate danger) | 250 ppm |
- Safety data sheet (SDS)

Related compounds
| Related compounds | Thiophenol; Benzeneselenol; Benzenetellurol; Sodium phenoxide; Catechol; Resorcinol; Hydroquinone; Phloroglucinol; Pyrogallol; Hydroxyquinol; 1,2,3,5-Tetrahydroxybenzene; Pentahydroxybenzene; Benzenehexol |
- Except where otherwise noted, data are given for materials in their standard state (at 25 °C [77 °F], 100 kPa). verify (what is ?) Infobox references

Phenol (also known as carbolic acid, phenolic acid, or benzenol) is an aromatic organic compound with the molecular formula C_{6}H_{5}OH. It is a white crystalline solid that is volatile and can catch fire.

The molecule consists of a phenyl group (−C_{6}H_{5}) bonded to a hydroxy group (−OH). Mildly acidic, it requires careful handling because it can cause chemical burns. It is acutely toxic and is considered a health hazard.

Phenol was first extracted from coal tar, but today is produced on a large scale (about 7 million tonnes a year) from petroleum-derived feedstocks. It is an important industrial commodity as a precursor to many materials and useful compounds, and is a liquid when manufactured. It is primarily used to synthesize plastics and related materials. Phenol and its chemical derivatives are essential for production of polycarbonates, epoxies, explosives such as picric acid, Bakelite, nylon, detergents, herbicides such as phenoxy herbicides, and numerous pharmaceutical drugs.

== Properties ==
Phenol is an organic compound appreciably soluble in water, with about 84.2 g dissolving in 1 litre (0.895 M). Homogeneous mixtures of phenol and water at phenol to water mass ratios of ~2.6 and higher are possible. The sodium salt of phenol, sodium phenoxide, is far more water-soluble. Phenol is a combustible solid (NFPA rating = 2). When heated, phenol produces flammable vapors that are explosive at concentrations of 3 to 10% in air. Carbon dioxide or dry chemical extinguishers should be used to fight phenol fires.

=== Acidity ===
Phenol is a weak acid, with a pH range of 5 to 6. In aqueous solution in the pH range ca. 8–12 it is in equilibrium with the phenolate anion C_{6}H_{5}O^{−} (also called phenoxide or carbolate):

C_{6}H_{5}OH ⇌ C_{6}H_{5}O^{−} + H^{+}

Resonance structures of the phenoxide anion

Phenol is more acidic than aliphatic alcohols. Its enhanced acidity is attributed to resonance stabilization of phenolate anion. In this way, the negative charge on oxygen is delocalized on to the ortho and para carbon atoms through the pi system. An alternative explanation involves the sigma framework, postulating that the dominant effect is the induction from the more electronegative sp^{2} hybridised carbons; the comparatively more powerful inductive withdrawal of electron density that is provided by the sp^{2} system compared to an sp^{3} system allows for great stabilization of the oxyanion. In support of the second explanation, the pK_{a} of the enol of acetone in water is 10.9, making it only slightly less acidic than phenol (pK_{a} 10.0). Thus, the greater number of resonance structures available to phenoxide compared to acetone enolate seems to contribute little to its stabilization. However, the situation changes when solvation effects are excluded.

==== Hydrogen bonding ====
In carbon tetrachloride and in alkane solvents, phenol hydrogen bonds with a wide range of Lewis bases such as pyridine, diethyl ether, and diethyl sulfide. The enthalpies of adduct formation and the −OH IR frequency shifts accompanying adduct formation have been compiled. Phenol is classified as a hard acid.

==== Tautomerism ====
Phenol-cyclohexadienone tautomerism

Phenol exhibits keto-enol tautomerism with its unstable keto tautomer cyclohexadienone, but the effect is nearly negligible. The equilibrium constant for enolisation is approximately 10^{−13}, which means only one in every ten trillion molecules is in the keto form at any moment. The small amount of stabilisation gained by exchanging a C=C bond for a C=O bond is more than offset by the large destabilisation resulting from the loss of aromaticity. Phenol therefore exists essentially entirely in the enol form. 4,4-Disubstituted cyclohexadienone can undergo a dienone–phenol rearrangement in acid conditions and form stable 3,4‐disubstituted phenol.

For substituted phenols, several factors can favor the keto tautomer: (a) additional hydroxy groups (see resorcinol) (b) annulation as in the formation of naphthols, and (c) deprotonation to give the phenolate.

Phenoxides are enolates stabilised by aromaticity. Under normal circumstances, phenoxide is more reactive at the oxygen position, but the oxygen position is a "hard" nucleophile whereas the alpha-carbon positions tend to be "soft".

=== Reactions ===
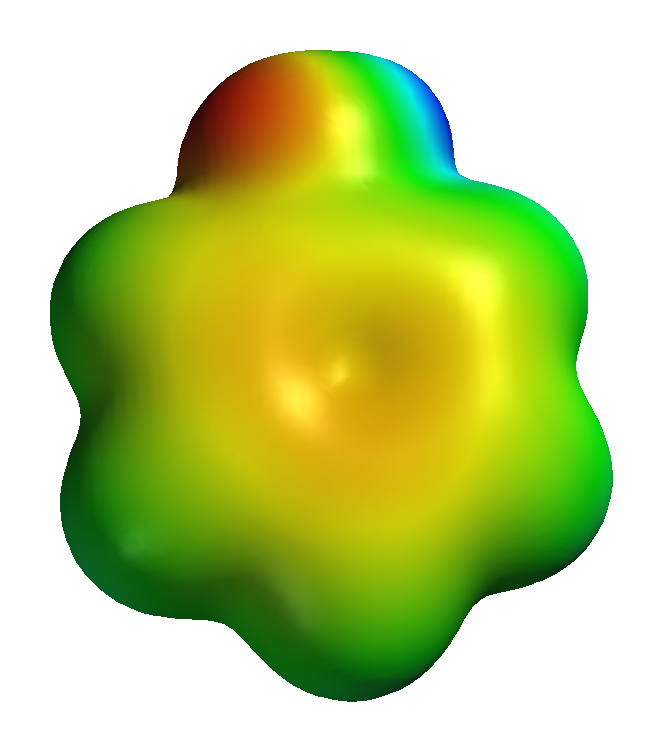
Polar surface area of a "neutral" phenol substructure "shape". An image of a computed electrostatic surface of neutral phenol molecule, showing neutral regions in green, electronegative areas in orange-red, and the electropositive phenolic proton in blue.

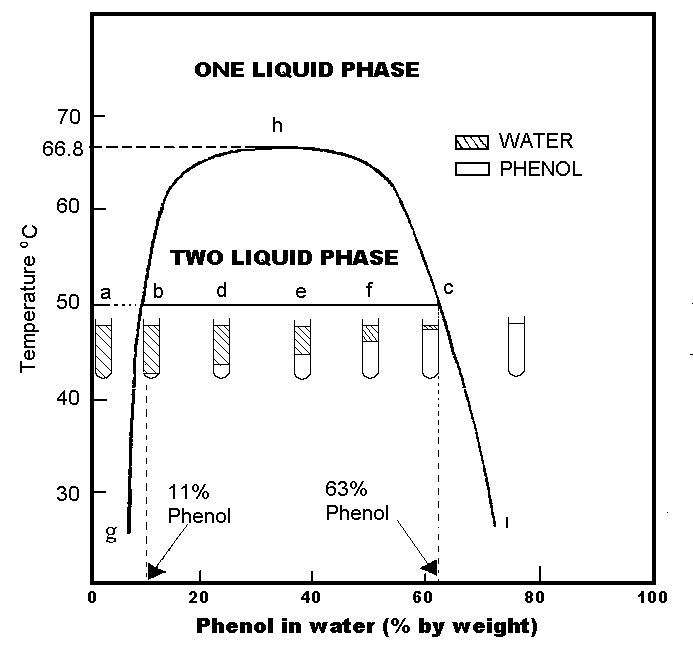
Phenol water phase diagram: Certain combinations of phenol and water can make two solutions in one bottle.

Phenol is highly reactive toward electrophilic aromatic substitution. The enhanced nucleophilicity is attributed to donation of pi electron density from oxygen into the ring. Many groups can be attached to the ring, via halogenation, acylation, sulfonation, and related processes.

Phenol is so strongly activated that bromination and chlorination lead readily to polysubstitution. The reaction affords 2- and 4-substituted derivatives. The regiochemistry of halogenation changes in strongly acidic solutions where [PhOH_{2}]^{+} predominates. Phenol reacts with dilute nitric acid at room temperature to give a mixture of 2-nitrophenol and 4-nitrophenol while with concentrated nitric acid, additional nitro groups are introduced, e.g. to give 2,4,6-trinitrophenol. Friedel Crafts alkylations of phenol and its derivatives often proceed without catalysts. Alkylating agents include alkyl halides, alkenes, and ketones. Thus, adamantyl-1-bromide, dicyclopentadiene), and cyclohexanones give respectively 4-adamantylphenol, a bis(2-hydroxyphenyl) derivative, and a 4-cyclohexylphenols. Alcohols and hydroperoxides alkylate phenols in the presence of solid acid catalysts (e.g. certain zeolite). Cresols and cumyl phenols can be produced in that way.

Aqueous solutions of phenol are weakly acidic and turn blue litmus slightly to red. Phenol is neutralized by sodium hydroxide forming sodium phenate or phenolate, but being weaker than carbonic acid, it cannot be neutralized by sodium bicarbonate or sodium carbonate to liberate carbon dioxide.

C_{6}H_{5}OH + NaOH → C_{6}H_{5}ONa + H_{2}O

When a mixture of phenol and benzoyl chloride are shaken in presence of dilute sodium hydroxide solution, phenyl benzoate is formed. This is an example of the Schotten–Baumann reaction:

C_{6}H_{5}COCl + HOC_{6}H_{5} → C_{6}H_{5}CO_{2}C_{6}H_{5} + HCl

Phenol is reduced to benzene when it is distilled with zinc dust or when its vapour is passed over granules of zinc at 400 °C:

C_{6}H_{5}OH + Zn → C_{6}H_{6} + ZnO

When phenol is treated with diazomethane in the presence of boron trifluoride (BF_{3}), anisole is obtained as the main product and nitrogen gas as a byproduct.

C_{6}H_{5}OH + CH_{2}N_{2} → C_{6}H_{5}OCH_{3} + N_{2}

Phenol and its derivatives react with neutral iron(III) chloride to give intensely violet colored solutions containing phenoxide complexes.

Phenol gives a positive result with the Ceric Ammonium Nitrate (CAN) test, and produces a dark brownish precipitate, contrary to standard aliphatic alcohols which typically give a pink or red color.

== Production ==
Because of phenol's commercial importance, many methods have been developed for its production, but the cumene process is the dominant technology.

=== Cumene process ===
The Hock or Cumene process leading to phenol via autoxidation of cumene.

Accounting for 95% of production (2003) is the cumene process, also called Hock process. It involves the partial oxidation of cumene (isopropylbenzene) via the Hock rearrangement: Compared to most other processes, the cumene process uses mild conditions and inexpensive raw materials. For the process to be economical, both phenol and the acetone by-product must be in demand. In 2010, worldwide demand for acetone was approximately 6.7 million tonnes, 83 percent of which was satisfied with acetone produced by the cumene process.

A route analogous to the cumene process begins with cyclohexylbenzene. It is oxidized to a hydroperoxide, akin to the production of cumene hydroperoxide. Via the Hock rearrangement, cyclohexylbenzene hydroperoxide cleaves to give phenol and cyclohexanone. Cyclohexanone is an important precursor to some nylons.

=== Oxidation of benzene, toluene, cyclohexylbenzene ===
The direct oxidation of benzene (C_{6}H_{6}) to phenol is possible, but it has not been commercialized:

C_{6}H_{6} + O → C_{6}H_{5}OH

Nitrous oxide is a potentially "green" oxidant that is a more potent oxidant than O_{2}. Routes for the generation of nitrous oxide however remain uncompetitive.

An electrosynthesis employing alternating current gives phenol from benzene.

The oxidation of toluene, as developed by Dow Chemical, involves copper-catalyzed reaction of molten sodium benzoate with air:

C_{6}H_{5}CH_{3} + 2 O_{2} → C_{6}H_{5}OH + CO_{2} + H_{2}O

The reaction is proposed to proceed via formation of benzyoylsalicylate.

Autoxidation of cyclohexylbenzene gives the hydroperoxide. Decomposition of this hydroperoxide affords cyclohexanone and phenol.

=== Older methods ===
Early methods relied on extraction of phenol from coal derivatives or the hydrolysis of benzene derivatives.

==== Hydrolysis of benzenesulfonic acid ====
The original commercial route was developed by Bayer and Monsanto in the early 1900s, based on discoveries by Wurtz and Kekulé. The method involves the reaction of a strong base with benzenesulfonic acid, proceeded by the reaction of hydroxide with sodium benzenesulfonate to give sodium phenoxide. Acidification of the latter gives phenol. The net conversion is:

C_{6}H_{5}SO_{3}H + 2 NaOH → C_{6}H_{5}OH + Na_{2}SO_{3} + H_{2}O

==== Hydrolysis of chlorobenzene ====
Chlorobenzene can be hydrolyzed to phenol using a base (Dow process) or steam (Raschig–Hooker process):

C_{6}H_{5}Cl + NaOH → C_{6}H_{5}OH + NaCl
C_{6}H_{5}Cl + H_{2}O → C_{6}H_{5}OH + HCl

These methods suffer from the cost of the chlorobenzene and the need to dispose of the chloride byproduct.

==== Coal pyrolysis ====
Phenol is also a recoverable byproduct of coal pyrolysis. In the Lummus process, the oxidation of toluene to benzoic acid is conducted separately.

=== Miscellaneous methods ===
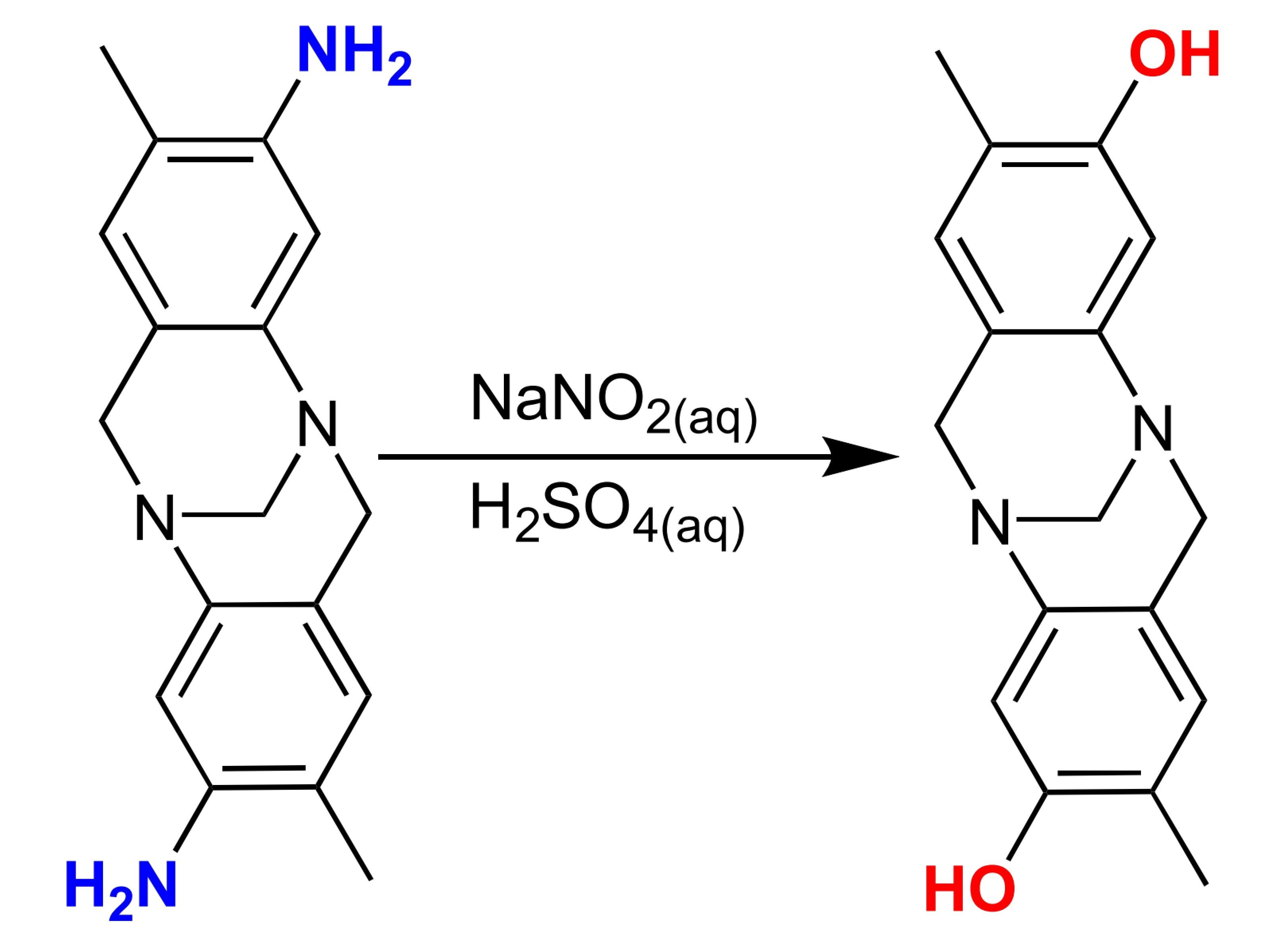
Amine to phenol

Phenyldiazonium salts hydrolyze to phenol. The method is of no commercial interest since the precursor is expensive.

C_{6}H_{5}NH_{2} + HCl + NaNO_{2} → C_{6}H_{5}OH + N_{2} + H_{2}O + NaCl

Salicylic acid decarboxylates to phenol.

=== Shipping ===
Phenol, which is produced and hence transported in large volumes, is shipped in a molten state below 70 °C (158 °F). The melting point is lowered and corrosive nature enhanced in the presence of small amounts of water. Typically, stainless steel containers and nitrogen-blanketing are required to prevent discoloration.

== Exposure and toxicity ==
Exposure to phenol may occur in people living near landfills, hazardous waste sites or factories manufacturing it. Low levels of phenol exposure may occur in consumer products, such as toothpastes and throat lozenges, skin or pain treatments, cigarette smoke, and in some foods or water.

Exposure to phenol through any form of ingestion or contact can produce systemic poisoning, with possible symptoms including transient brain stimulation, followed by coma and seizures over minutes to hours following exposure. Other symptoms may include hemolytic anemia, profuse sweating, hypotension, arrhythmia, pulmonary edema, nausea, vomiting, and diarrhea. Chronic exposure to phenol or its vapor may cause kidney toxicity, skin lesions, or gastrointestinal disease. Phenol is metabolized in the liver, and excreted by the kidneys.

If inhaled, ingested or by skin contact, phenol can enter the blood, possibly causing breathing problems, headaches, or sore eyes. High amounts of phenol contacting the skin may cause liver disease, irregular heartbeat, seizures, coma, and, rarely, death. Repeated or prolonged skin contact with phenol may cause dermatitis, or even second and third-degree burns. Its corrosive effect on skin and mucous membranes is due to a protein-degenerating effect. Chemical burns from skin exposures can be decontaminated by washing with polyethylene glycol, isopropyl alcohol, or with copious amounts of water.

Safety concerns have caused phenol to be banned from use in cosmetic products in the European Union and Canada.

Besides its hydrophobic effects, another possible mechanism for the toxicity of phenol is the formation of phenoxyl radicals.

== Uses ==
=== Chemicals ===
The major uses of phenol, consuming two thirds of its production, involve its conversion to precursors for plastics. Condensation with acetone gives bisphenol A, a key precursor to polycarbonates and epoxide resins. Condensation of phenol, alkylphenols, or diphenols with formaldehyde gives phenolic resins, an example of which is Bakelite. Partial hydrogenation of phenol gives cyclohexanone, a precursor to nylon. Nonionic detergents are produced by alkylation of phenol to give the alkylphenols, e.g., nonylphenol, which are then subjected to ethoxylation.

Phenol is also a versatile precursor to a large collection of drugs, most notably aspirin but also many herbicides and pharmaceutical drugs. Phenol is a component in liquid–liquid phenol–chloroform extraction technique used in molecular biology for obtaining nucleic acids from tissues or cell culture samples. Depending on the pH of the solution either DNA or RNA can be extracted.

Phenol is so inexpensive that it also attracts many small-scale uses. It is a component of industrial paint strippers used in the aviation industry for the removal of epoxy, polyurethane and other chemically resistant coatings.

=== Topical anesthetic ===
Concentrated liquid phenol can be used topically as a local anesthetic for otology procedures, such as myringotomy and tympanotomy tube placement, as an alternative to general anesthesia or other local anesthetics. Phenol spray, with phenol as the active ingredient, is used medically to treat sore throat. It is the active ingredient in some oral analgesics.

Concentrated phenol liquids are used for permanent treatment of ingrown toe and finger nails, a procedure known as a chemical matrixectomy. The procedure was first described by Otto Boll in 1945.

=== Nerve block ===
Phenol is used as a chemical denervation agent in analgesia treatment, such as for spasticity, arthritis, or cancer pain. Its effect on the nerve is to denature protein, diminish nerve fat and myelin content, and interrupt sensory transmission to the brain. If successful, pain relief may last for weeks to two years. Complications may include pain on injection, bleeding, or infection.

Clinical studies from 2023 to 2025 reported that local injection of phenol (1.5–3 ml of 6% phenol in sterile water) at three to five sensory knee nerves was effective as a neurolytic treatment to relieve pain associated with chronic osteoarthritis. The phenol method may be used for people who did not experience pain relief from radiofrequency ablation of knee nerves.

== History ==
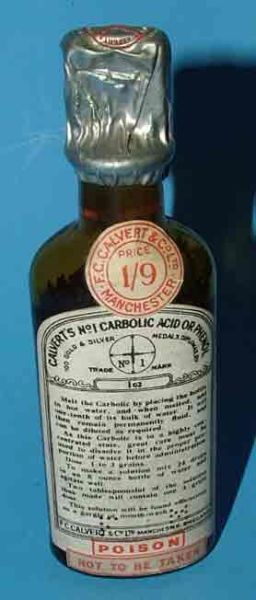
Bottle of Calvert's phenol antiseptic, Thackray Museum of Medicine

Phenol was discovered in 1834 by Friedlieb Ferdinand Runge, who extracted it (in impure form) from coal tar. Runge called phenol "Karbolsäure" (coal-oil-acid, carbolic acid). Coal tar remained the primary source until the development of the petrochemical industry. French chemist Auguste Laurent extracted phenol in its pure form, as a derivative of benzene, in 1841. In 1836, Auguste Laurent coined the name "phène" for benzene; this is the root of the word "phenol" and "phenyl". In 1843, French chemist Charles Gerhardt coined the name "phénol".

Commercial English production of Phenol was started by F. C. Calvert and Co in 1857 established by Frederick Crace Calvert which is by a plaque on Princess St Manchester and on his wikipedia page.

The antiseptic properties of phenol were used by Sir Joseph Lister in his pioneering technique of antiseptic surgery. Lister decided that the wounds had to be thoroughly cleaned. He then covered the wounds with a piece of rag or lint covered in phenol. The skin irritation caused by continual exposure to phenol eventually led to the introduction of aseptic (germ-free) techniques in surgery. Lister's work was inspired by the works and experiments of his contemporary Louis Pasteur in sterilizing various biological media. He theorized that if germs could be killed or prevented, no infection would occur. Lister reasoned that a chemical could be used to destroy the micro-organisms that cause infection.

Meanwhile, in Carlisle, England, officials were experimenting with sewage treatment using carbolic acid to reduce the smell of sewage cesspools. Having heard of these developments, and having previously experimented with other chemicals for antiseptic purposes without much success, Lister decided to try carbolic acid as a wound antiseptic. He had his first chance on August 12, 1865, when he received a patient: an eleven-year-old boy with a tibia bone fracture which pierced the skin of his lower leg. Ordinarily, amputation would be the only solution. However, Lister decided to try carbolic acid. After setting the bone and supporting the leg with splints, he soaked clean cotton towels in undiluted carbolic acid and applied them to the wound, covered with a layer of tin foil, leaving them for four days. When he checked the wound, Lister was pleasantly surprised to find no signs of infection, just redness near the edges of the wound from mild burning by the carbolic acid. Reapplying fresh bandages with diluted carbolic acid, the boy was able to walk home after about six weeks of treatment.

By 16 March 1867, when the first results of Lister's work were published in the Lancet, he had treated a total of eleven patients using his new antiseptic method. Of those, only one had died, and that was through a complication that was nothing to do with Lister's wound-dressing technique. Now, for the first time, patients with compound fractures were likely to leave the hospital with all their limbs intact

— Richard Hollingham, Blood and Guts: A History of Surgery, p. 62

Before antiseptic operations were introduced at the hospital, there were sixteen deaths in thirty-five surgical cases. Almost one in every two patients died. After antiseptic surgery was introduced in the summer of 1865, there were only six deaths in forty cases. The mortality rate had dropped from almost 50 per cent to around 15 per cent. It was a remarkable achievement

— Richard Hollingham, Blood and Guts: A History of Surgery, p. 63

Phenol was the main ingredient of the "carbolic smoke ball," an ineffective device marketed in London in the 19th century as protection against influenza and other ailments, and the subject of the famous law case Carlill v Carbolic Smoke Ball Company. In the tort law case of Roe v Minister of Health, phenol was used to sterilize anaesthetic packed in ampoules, in which it contaminated the anaesthetic through invisible micro-cracks and caused paraplegia to the plaintiffs.

=== Second World War ===
The toxic effect of phenol on the central nervous system causes sudden collapse and loss of consciousness in both humans and animals; a state of cramping precedes these symptoms because of the motor activity controlled by the central nervous system. Injections of phenol were used as a means of individual execution by Nazi Germany during the Second World War. It was originally used by the Nazis in 1939 as part of the mass-murder of disabled people under Aktion T4. The Germans learned that extermination of smaller groups was more economical by injection of each victim with phenol. Phenol injections were given to thousands of people. Maximilian Kolbe was also murdered with a phenol injection after surviving two weeks of dehydration and starvation in Auschwitz when he volunteered to die in place of a stranger. Approximately one gram is sufficient to cause death.

== Occurrences ==
Phenol is a normal metabolic product, excreted in quantities up to 40 mg/L in human urine. The temporal gland secretion of male elephants showed the presence of phenol and 4-methylphenol during musth. It is also one of the chemical compounds found in castoreum. This compound is ingested from the plants the beaver eats.

Phenol is a measurable component in the aroma and taste of the distinctive Islay scotch whisky, generally ~30 ppm, but it can be over 160 ppm in the malted barley used to produce whisky. This amount is different from and presumably higher than the amount in the distillate.

== Biodegradation ==
Cryptanaerobacter phenolicus is a bacterium species that produces benzoate from phenol via 4-hydroxybenzoate. Rhodococcus phenolicus is a bacterium species able to degrade phenol as sole carbon source.

== Naming ==
The word phenol is also used to refer to any compound that contains a six-membered aromatic ring, bonded directly to a hydroxyl group (-OH). Thus, phenols are a class of organic compounds of which the phenol discussed in this article is the simplest member.

== See also ==
- Bamberger rearrangement
- Claisen rearrangement
- Cresol
- Fries rearrangement
- Polyphenol
