= Cyclooctanone =

Identifiers
| CAS Number | 502-49-8 |
| 3D model (JSmol) | Interactive image |
| ChEMBL | ChEMBL18737 |
| ChemSpider | 9974 |
| ECHA InfoCard | 100.007.219 |
| EC Number | 207-940-2 |
| PubChem CID | 10403 |
| UNII | Z4GO9P8SUZ |
| CompTox Dashboard (EPA) | DTXSID3060114 |
- InChI: InChI=1S/C8H14O/c9-8-6-4-2-1-3-5-7-8/h1-7H2 Key: IIRFCWANHMSDCG-UHFFFAOYSA-N
- SMILES: C1CCCC(=O)CCC1

Properties
| Chemical formula | C_{8}H_{14}O |
| Molar mass | 126.199 g·mol^{−1} |
| Appearance | colorless solid |
| Density | 0.956 g/cm^{3} |
| Melting point | 29 °C (84 °F; 302 K) |
| Boiling point | 86 12 torr |
| Refractive index (n_{D}) | 0.959 |

Hazards
- GHS labelling
| Pictograms | (GHS05: Corrosive) (GHS07: Exclamation mark) |
| Signal word | Danger |
| Hazard statements | H315, H319, H335 |
| Precautionary statements | P260, P264, P264+P265, P271, P280, P301+P330+P331, P302+P352, P302+P361+P354, P304+P340, P305+P351+P338, P305+P354+P338, P316, P319, P321, P332+P317, P337+P317, P362+P364, P363, P403+P233, P405, P501 |

Related compounds
| Related compounds | cyclooctanol |
- Except where otherwise noted, data are given for materials in their standard state (at 25 °C [77 °F], 100 kPa). Infobox references

Cyclooctanone is an organic compound with the formula (CH_{2})_{7}CO. It is a waxy white solid.

== Synthesis and reactions ==
It can be prepared by

- Jones oxidation or Dess-Martin oxidation of cyclooctanol.
- ketonization reaction starting with azelaic acid.

Among its many reactions, Baeyer-Villiger oxidation gives the nine-membered cyclic ester.

== See also ==
- Suberone
