= Cyclobutanol =

Organic chemical compound

Names
- Preferred IUPAC name Cyclobutanol
- Other names Cyclobutyl alcohol, Hydroxycyclobutane

Identifiers
CAS Number	2919-23-5
3D model (JSmol)	Interactive image
ChEMBL	ChEMBL449234
ChemSpider	68700
ECHA InfoCard	100.018.963
EC Number	220-858-1
PubChem CID	76218
UNII	AD482C8GST
CompTox Dashboard (EPA)	DTXSID5062712
- InChI: InChI=1S/C4H8O/c5-4-2-1-3-4/h4-5H,1-3H2 Key: KTHXBEHDVMTNOH-UHFFFAOYSA-N
- SMILES: OC1CCC1

Properties
Chemical formula	C_{4}H_{8}O
Molar mass	72.107 g·mol^{−1}

Hazards
- GHS labelling
Pictograms	(GHS02: Flammable)
Signal word	Danger
Hazard statements	H225
Precautionary statements	P210, P233, P240, P241, P242, P243, P280, P303+P361+P353, P370+P378, P403+P235, P501

Related compounds
Related	Cyclobutane; Cyclobutanone; Cyclobutene
Related compounds	Cyclopropanol; Cyclopentanol; Cyclohexanol; Cycloheptanol; Cyclooctanol
- Except where otherwise noted, data are given for materials in their standard state (at 25 °C [77 °F], 100 kPa). verify (what is ?) Infobox references

Cyclobutanol is an organic compound with the chemical formula C_{4}H_{8}O; it is defined as a cyclobutyl group with a hydroxyl group pendant and thus a cycloalkanol. Physically, it is a yellowish clear liquid that crystallizes orthorhombically at low-temperatures.

Cyclobutylamine's Demjanov rearrangement with nitrous acid gives cyclobutanol, and cyclopropylmethanol rearranges in strong acid to the same. Metal hydrides reduce cyclobutanone to cyclobutanol; conversely, cyclobutanol oxidation is a salt-free route to cyclobutanone.
