= Cyclooctanol =

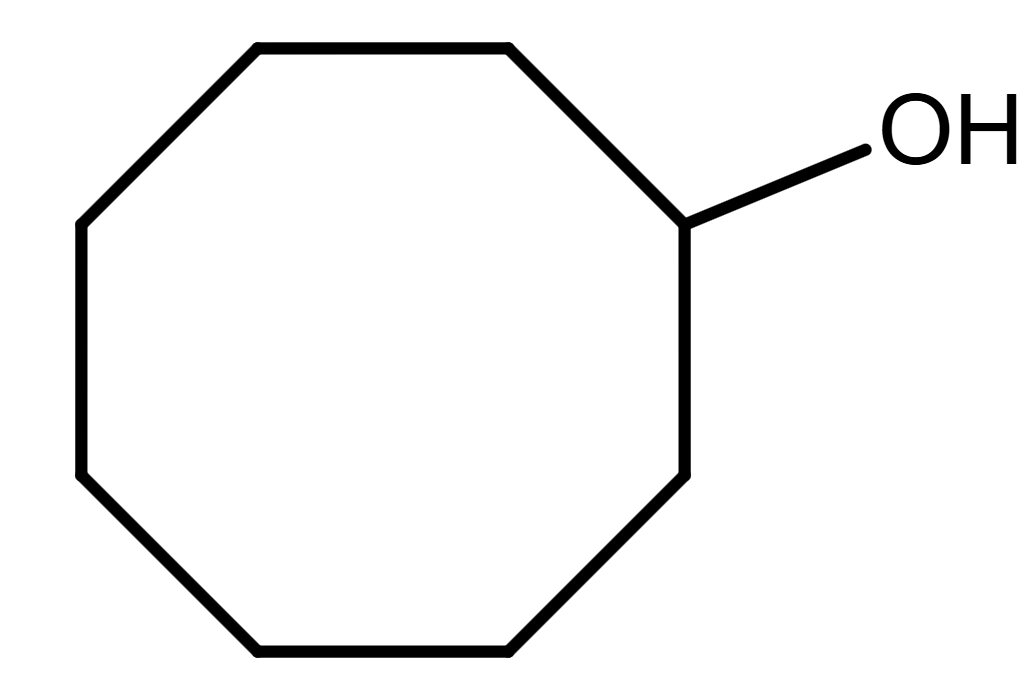

Names
- IUPAC name Cyclooctanol
- Other names: Cyclooctyl alcohol

Identifiers
CAS Number	696-71-9
3D model (JSmol)	Interactive image
ChEMBL	ChEMBL457729
ChemSpider	12241
ECHA InfoCard	100.010.729
EC Number	211-800-6
PubChem CID	12766
UNII	N948SW87NY
CompTox Dashboard (EPA)	DTXSID80219875
- InChI: InChI=1S/C8H16O/c9-8-6-4-2-1-3-5-7-8/h8-9H,1-7H2 Key: FHADSMKORVFYOS-UHFFFAOYSA-N
- SMILES: C1CCCCCCC1O

Properties
Chemical formula	C_{8}H_{15}OH
Molar mass	128.215 g·mol^{−1}
Appearance	Colorless viscous liquid
Odor	Pleasant
Density	0.974 g/cm^{3}
Melting point	15 °C (59 °F; 288 K)
Boiling point	209 °C (408 °F; 482 K)
Solubility in water	Slightly, 6.576 g/l
Solubility	Soluble in organic solvents such as ethanol and diethyl ether. Miscible with acetone.
log P	2.09160
Vapor pressure	0.1 hPa at 20 °C (68 °F)
Refractive index (n_{D})	1.486

Hazards
- Occupational safety and health (OHS/OSH)
Main hazards	May cause serious eye irritation
- GHS labelling
Pictograms	(GHS07: Exclamation mark)
Signal word	Warning
Hazard statements	H227, H302, H315, H319, H335
Precautionary statements	P210, P261, P264, P264+P265, P270, P271, P280, P301+P317, P302+P352, P304+P340, P305+P351+P338, P319, P321, P330, P332+P317, P337+P317, P362+P364, P370+P378, P403, P403+P233, P405, P501
Flash point	86 °C (187 °F; 359 K)
- Lethal dose or concentration (LD, LC)
LD_{50} (median dose)	735 mg/kg (oral, rat)

Related compounds
Related compounds	Cyclopropanol; Cyclobutanol; Cyclopentanol; Cyclohexanol; Cycloheptanol; Cyclooctanone
- Except where otherwise noted, data are given for materials in their standard state (at 25 °C [77 °F], 100 kPa). Infobox references

Cyclooctanol is an organic compound with the formula (CH_{2})_{7}CHOH or C_{8}H_{15}OH. It is a colorless oily liquid with a pleasant odor. The molecule consists of 8-membered cyclooctane ring in which one of its hydrogen atoms is replaced by a hydroxyl group.

== Synthesis ==
Cyclooctanol can be obtained by hydrolysis of cyclooctyl formate.

HCOOC_{8}H_{15} + H_{2}O → C_{8}H_{15}OH + HCOOH

Cyclooctanol can also be synthesized by oxidation of cyclooctane by hydrogen peroxide with polyoxometalates as catalysts in acetonitrile. The reaction byproducts are cyclooctanone and cyclooctyl hydroperoxide.

== Properties ==
It has been investigated how cyclooctanol behaves under high pressure. At around 0.4 GPa cyclooctanol becomes a solid, which is in the form of plastic crystals. At around 1.1 GPa, it becomes a normal ordered crystal phase. These phase transitions are reversible.

Under high pressure, new solid phase of cyclooctanol (phase III) is discovered and characterized as a normal crystal phase, and all other solid phases (I, II, IV) are characterized as plastic crystal phases.

== Reactions ==
Cyclooctanol reacts with diethylaminosulfur trifluoride to give fluorocyclooctane and cyclooctene.
