= Cyclohexene =

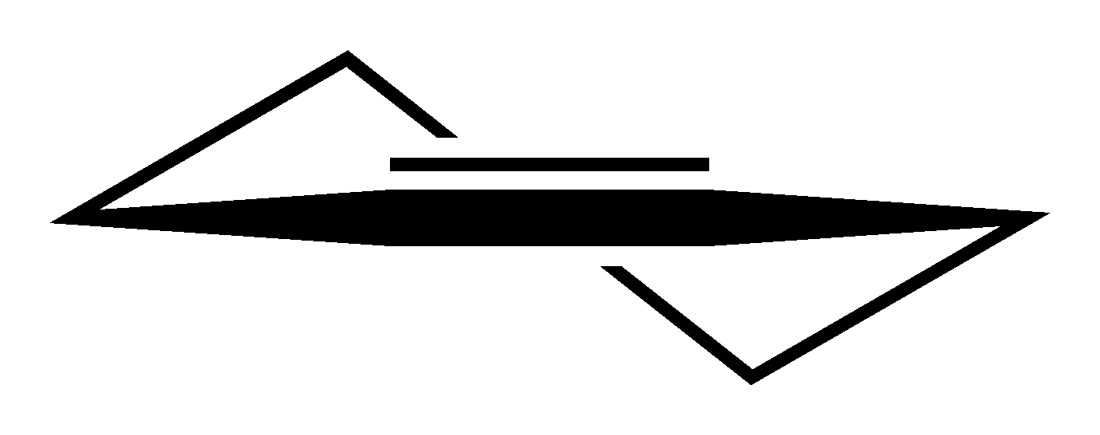

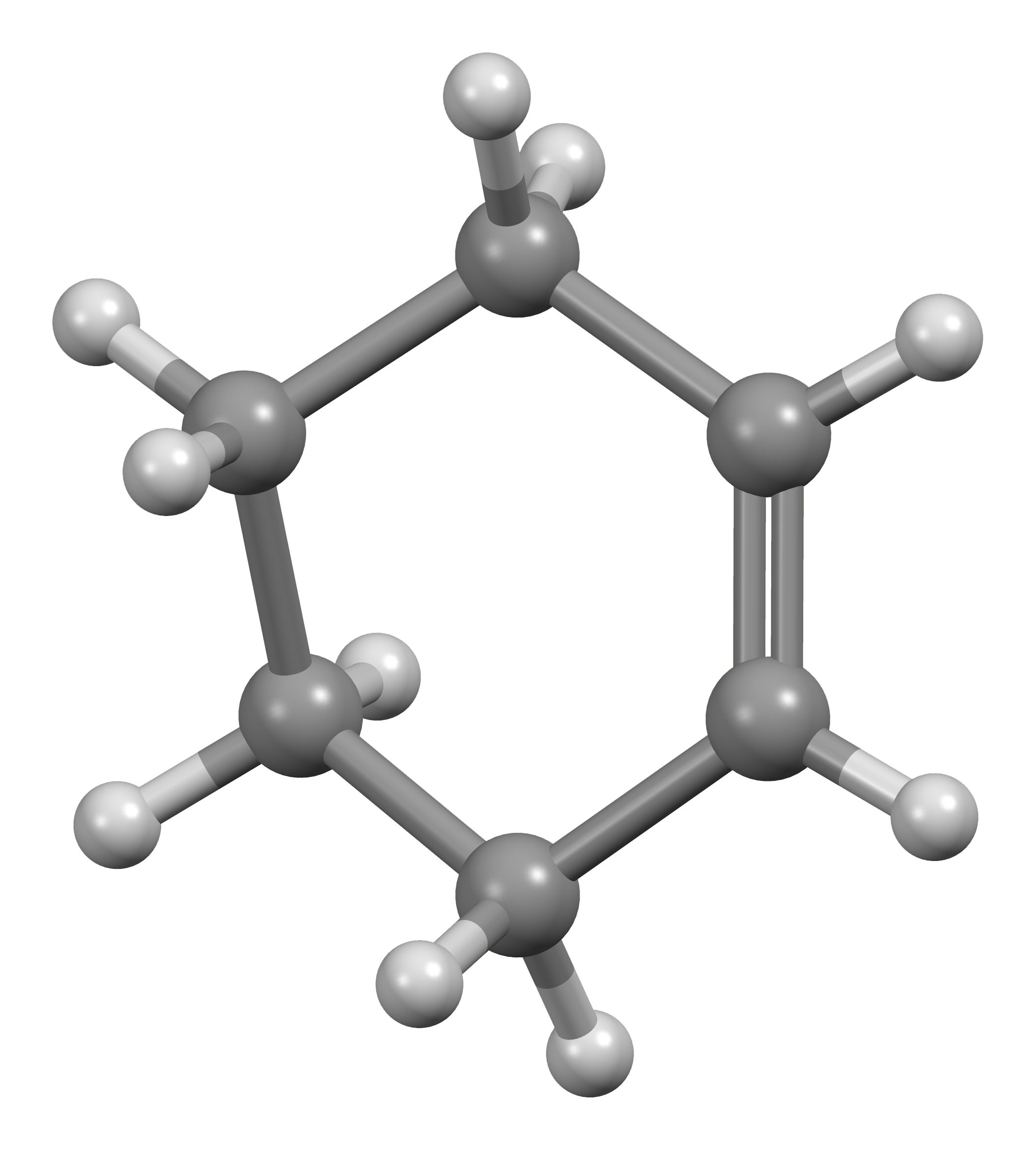

Names
- Preferred IUPAC name Cyclohexene
- Other names Tetrahydrobenzene, 1,2,3,4-Tetrahydrobenzene, Benzenetetrahydride, Cyclohex-1-ene, Hexanaphthylene, UN 2256

Identifiers
CAS Number	110-83-8
3D model (JSmol)	Interactive image
Beilstein Reference	906737
ChEBI	CHEBI:36404
ChEMBL	ChEMBL16396
ChemSpider	7788
ECHA InfoCard	100.003.462
EC Number	203-807-8
Gmelin Reference	1659
PubChem CID	8079
RTECS number	GW2500000
UNII	12L0P8F7GN
CompTox Dashboard (EPA)	DTXSID9038717
- InChI: InChI=1S/C6H10/c1-2-4-6-5-3-1/h1-2H,3-6H2 Key: HGCIXCUEYOPUTN-UHFFFAOYSA-N; InChI=1/C6H10/c1-2-4-6-5-3-1/h1-2H,3-6H2 Key: HGCIXCUEYOPUTN-UHFFFAOYAQ
- SMILES: C1CCC=CC1

Properties
Chemical formula	C_{6}H_{10}
Molar mass	82.143 g/mol
Appearance	colorless liquid
Odor	sweet
Density	0.8110 g/cm^{3}
Melting point	−103.5 °C (−154.3 °F; 169.7 K)
Boiling point	82.98 °C (181.36 °F; 356.13 K)
Solubility in water	slightly soluble in water
Solubility	miscible with organic solvents
Vapor pressure	8.93 kPa (20 °C) 11.9 kPa (25 °C)
Henry's law constant (k_{H})	0.022 mol·kg^{−1}·bar^{−1}
Magnetic susceptibility (χ)	−57.5·10^{−6} cm^{3}/mol
Refractive index (n_{D})	1.4465

Hazards
- GHS labelling
Pictograms	(GHS02: Flammable) (GHS06: Toxic) (GHS07: Exclamation mark) (GHS08: Health hazard) (GHS09: Environmental hazard)
Signal word	Danger
Hazard statements	H225, H302, H305, H311, H411
Precautionary statements	P210, P233, P240, P241, P242, P243, P264, P270, P273, P280, P301+P310, P301+P312, P302+P352, P303+P361+P353, P312, P322, P330, P331, P361, P363, P370+P378, P391, P403+P235, P405, P501
NFPA 704 (fire diamond)	1 3 0
Flash point	−12 °C (10 °F; 261 K)
Autoignition temperature	244 °C (471 °F; 517 K)
Explosive limits	0.8–5%
- Lethal dose or concentration (LD, LC)
LD_{50} (median dose)	1407 mg/kg (oral, rat)
LC_{Lo} (lowest published)	13,196 ppm (mouse, 2 hr)
- NIOSH (US health exposure limits)
PEL (Permissible)	TWA 300 ppm (1015 mg/m^{3})
REL (Recommended)	TWA 300 ppm (1015 mg/m^{3})
IDLH (Immediate danger)	2000 ppm
Safety data sheet (SDS)	External MSDS
- Except where otherwise noted, data are given for materials in their standard state (at 25 °C [77 °F], 100 kPa). verify (what is ?) Infobox references

Cyclohexene is a hydrocarbon with the formula (CH_{2})_{4}C_{2}H_{2}. It is a cycloalkene. At room temperature, cyclohexene is a colorless liquid with a sharp odor. Among its uses, it is an intermediate in the commercial synthesis of nylon.

== Production and uses ==
Cyclohexene is produced by the partial hydrogenation of benzene, a process developed by the Asahi Chemical company. The main product of the process is cyclohexane because cyclohexene is more easily hydrogenated than benzene.

In the laboratory, it can be prepared by dehydration of cyclohexanol.

C_{6}H_{11}OH → C_{6}H_{10} + H_{2}O

== Reactions and uses ==
Benzene is converted to cyclohexylbenzene by acid-catalyzed alkylation with cyclohexene. Cyclohexylbenzene is a precursor to both phenol and cyclohexanone.

Hydration of cyclohexene gives cyclohexanol, which can be dehydrogenated to give cyclohexanone, a precursor to caprolactam.

The oxidative cleavage of cyclohexene gives adipic acid. Hydrogen peroxide is used as the oxidant in the presence of a tungsten catalyst.

1,7-Octadiene is produced by ethenolysis of cyclohexene. Bromination gives 1,2-dibromocyclohexane.

== Structure ==
Cyclohexene is most stable in a half-chair conformation, unlike the preference for a chair form of cyclohexane. One basis for the cyclohexane conformational preference for a chair is that it allows each bond of the ring to adopt a staggered conformation. For cyclohexene, however, the alkene is planar, equivalent to an eclipsed conformation at that bond.

== See also ==
- Diels-Alder reaction
- Cyclohexa-1,3-diene
- Cyclohexa-1,4-diene
