= 1-Bromoadamantane =

Names
- Preferred IUPAC name 1-Bromoadamantane
- Other names 1-Adamantyl bromide, adamantane, 1-bromo-, adamantyl bromide, tricyclo[3.3.1.1(3,7)]decane, 1-bromo-

Identifiers
CAS Number	768-90-1
3D model (JSmol)	Interactive image
Beilstein Reference	1098857
ChemSpider	71437
ECHA InfoCard	100.011.091
EC Number	230-777-3
PubChem CID	79106
UNII	GKV2KDH3R5
CompTox Dashboard (EPA)	DTXSID50880632
- InChI: InChI=1S/C10H15Br/c11-10-4-7-1-8(5-10)3-9(2-7)6-10/h7-9H,1-6H2 Key: VQHPRVYDKRESCL-UHFFFAOYSA-N; InChI=1/C10H15Br/c11-10-4-7-1-8(5-10)3-9(2-7)6-10/h7-9H,1-6H2 Key: VQHPRVYDKRESCL-UHFFFAOYAL
- SMILES: C1C2CC3CC1CC(C2)(C3)Br

Properties
Chemical formula	C_{10}H_{15}Br
Molar mass	215.134 g·mol^{−1}
Appearance	Solid
Melting point	117 °C (243 °F)
Boiling point	226 °C (439 °F)
Solubility in water	Insoluble

Hazards
NFPA 704 (fire diamond)	1 0 0
- Except where otherwise noted, data are given for materials in their standard state (at 25 °C [77 °F], 100 kPa). Infobox references

1-Bromoadamantane is the organobromine compound with the formula (CH_{2})_{6}(CH)_{3}CBr. A colorless solid, the compound is a derivative of adamantane with a bromine atom at one of the four equivalent methine positions.

== Reactions ==
Although of no commercial value, 1-bromoadamantane has often been employed for testing methodology. Hydrolysis of this bromide gives the alcohol 1-hydroxyadamantane.

It reacts with phenol to give para-adamantylphenol.

Classified as a tertiary alkyl bromide, it is reluctant to form organometallic derivatives. With Rieke calcium however it forms the organocalcium derivative, which functions like a Grignard reagent.
