= Cyclohexanol =

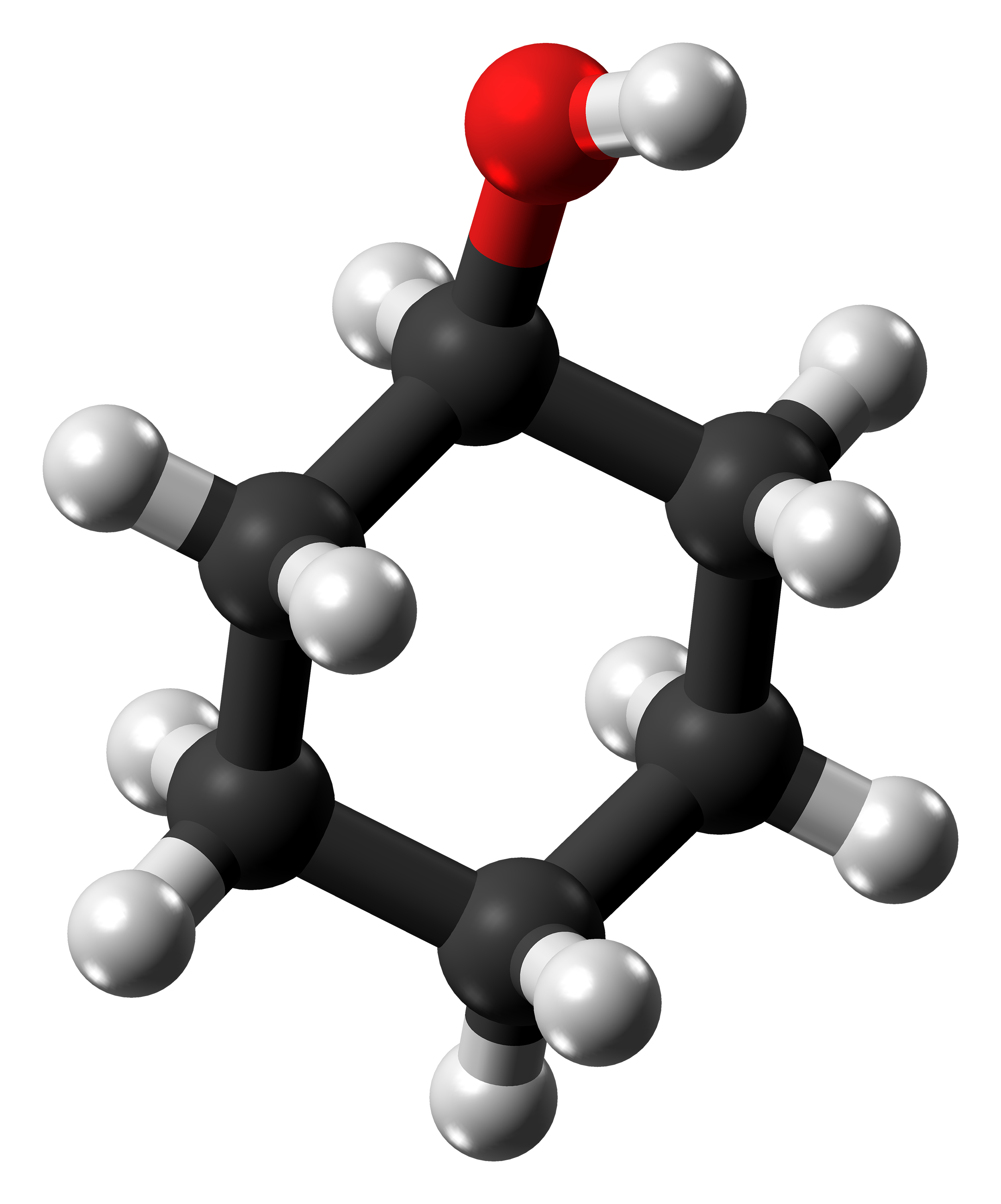

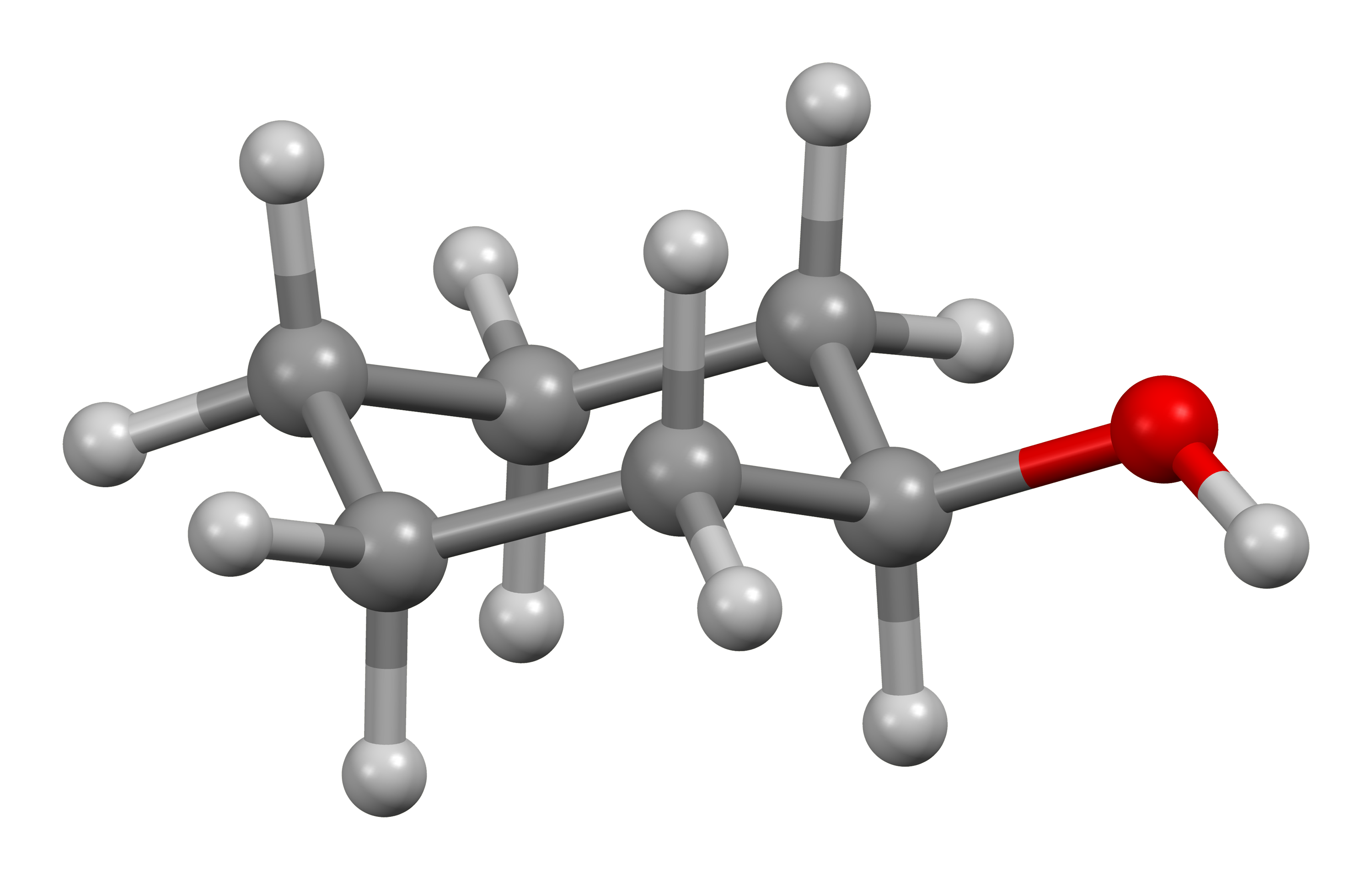

Names
- Preferred IUPAC name Cyclohexanol
- Other names Cyclohexyl Alcohol, hexahydrophenol, hydrophenol, hydroxycyclohexane, Naxol; Hexalin; Hydralin; HOCy

Identifiers
CAS Number	108-93-0
3D model (JSmol)	Interactive image
Abbreviations	CyOH
ChEBI	CHEBI:18099
ChEMBL	ChEMBL32010
ChemSpider	7678
DrugBank	DB03703
ECHA InfoCard	100.003.301
EC Number	203-630-6
KEGG	C00854
PubChem CID	7966
RTECS number	GV7875000
UNII	8E7S519M3P
CompTox Dashboard (EPA)	DTXSID4021894
- InChI: InChI=1S/C6H12O/c7-6-4-2-1-3-5-6/h6-7H,1-5H2 Key: HPXRVTGHNJAIIH-UHFFFAOYSA-N; InChI=1/C6H12O/c7-6-4-2-1-3-5-6/h6-7H,1-5H2 Key: HPXRVTGHNJAIIH-UHFFFAOYAN
- SMILES: C1CCCCC1O

Properties
Chemical formula	C_{6}H_{12}O
Molar mass	100.161 g·mol^{−1}
Appearance	Colorless, viscous liquid. Hygroscopic
Odor	camphor-like
Density	0.9624 g/mL, liquid
Melting point	25.93 °C (78.67 °F; 299.08 K)
Boiling point	161.84 °C (323.31 °F; 434.99 K)
Solubility in water	3.60 g/100 mL (20 °C); 4.3 g/100 mL (30 °C)
Solubility	soluble in ethanol, ethyl ether, acetone, chloroform miscible with ethyl acetate, linseed oil, benzene
Vapor pressure	1 mmHg (20 °C)
Henry's law constant (k_{H})	4.40 × 10^{−6} atm-cu m/mol
Acidity (pK_{a})	16
Magnetic susceptibility (χ)	−73.40·10^{−6} cm^{3}/mol
Refractive index (n_{D})	1.4641
Viscosity	41.07 mPa·s (30 °C)

Hazards
- Occupational safety and health (OHS/OSH)
Main hazards	Flammable, skin irritant Reacts violently with oxidizing agents
- GHS labelling
Pictograms	(GHS07: Exclamation mark)
Signal word	Warning
Hazard statements	H302, H315, H332, H335
Precautionary statements	P261, P264, P270, P271, P280, P301+P312, P302+P352, P304+P312, P304+P340, P312, P321, P330, P332+P313, P362, P403+P233, P405, P501
NFPA 704 (fire diamond)	1 2 0
Flash point	67 °C (153 °F; 340 K)
Autoignition temperature	300 °C (572 °F; 573 K)
Explosive limits	2.7–12%
- Lethal dose or concentration (LD, LC)
LD_{50} (median dose)	2060 mg/kg (oral, rat); 2200-2600 mg/kg (oral, rabbit)
- NIOSH (US health exposure limits)
PEL (Permissible)	TWA 50 ppm (200 mg/m^{3})
REL (Recommended)	TWA 50 ppm (200 mg/m^{3})
IDLH (Immediate danger)	400 ppm
Safety data sheet (SDS)	MSDS for cyclohexanol

Related compounds
Related compounds	Cyclopropanol; Cyclobutanol; Cyclopentanol; Cycloheptanol; Cyclooctanol; Phenol; Cyclohexanone
- Except where otherwise noted, data are given for materials in their standard state (at 25 °C [77 °F], 100 kPa). verify (what is ?) Infobox references

Cyclohexanol is the organic compound with the formula (CH_{2})_{5}CHOH or C_{6}H_{11}OH. The molecule is related to cyclohexane by replacement of one hydrogen atom by a hydroxyl group. This compound exists as a deliquescent colorless solid with a camphor-like odor, which, when very pure, melts near room temperature. Millions of tonnes are produced annually, mainly as a precursor to nylon.

== Production ==
Cyclohexanol is produced by the oxidation of cyclohexane in air, typically using cobalt catalysts:

2 C_{6}H_{12} + O_{2} → 2 C_{6}H_{11}OH

This process coforms cyclohexanone, and this mixture ("KA oil" for ketone-alcohol oil) is the main feedstock for the production of adipic acid. The oxidation involves radicals and the intermediacy of the hydroperoxide C_{6}H_{11}O_{2}H. Alternatively, cyclohexanol can be produced by the hydrogenation of phenol:

C_{6}H_{5}OH + 3 H_{2} → C_{6}H_{11}OH

This process can also be adjusted to favor the formation of cyclohexanone.

== Basic reactions ==
Cyclohexanol undergoes the main reactions expected for a secondary alcohol. Oxidation gives cyclohexanone, which is converted on a large scale in industry to the oxime, a precursor to caprolactam. As a laboratory exercise, this oxidation can be effected with chromic acid. Esterification affords the commercially useful derivatives dicyclohexyladipate and dicyclohexylphthalate, which are used as plasticizers. Heating in the presence of acid catalysts converts cyclohexanol to cyclohexene.

== Structure ==
Cyclohexanol has at least two solid phases. One of them is a plastic crystal.

== Applications ==
As indicated above, cyclohexanol is an important feedstock in the polymer industry, firstly as a precursor to nylons, but also to various plasticizers. Small amounts are used as a solvent.

== Safety ==
Cyclohexanol is moderately toxic: the Threshold Limit Value for the vapor for 8 h is 50 ppm. The IDLH concentration is set at 400 ppm, based on studies on the acute oral toxicity in animals. Few studies have been done on its carcinogenicity, but one study on rats found it to have co-carcinogenic effects.
