= Pimelic acid =

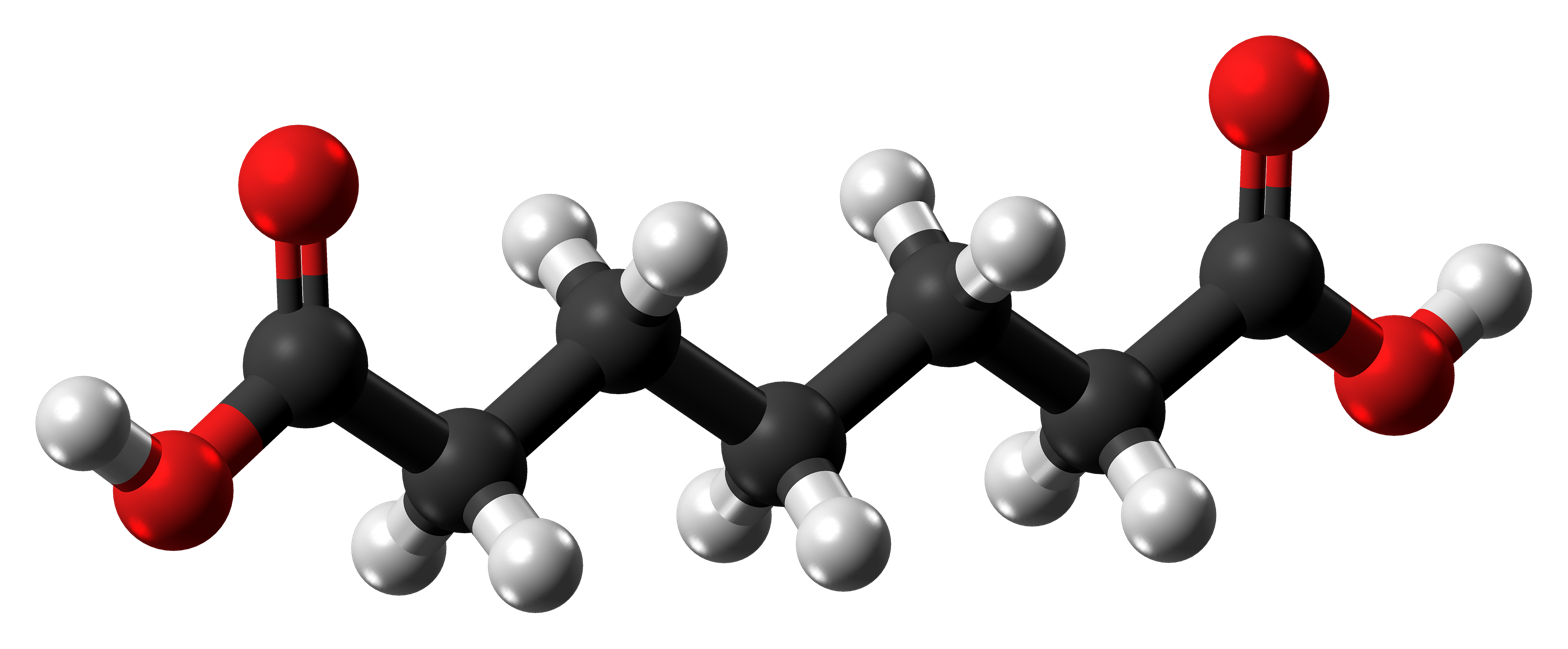

Names
- Preferred IUPAC name Heptanedioic acid

Identifiers
CAS Number	111-16-0
3D model (JSmol)	Interactive image
ChEBI	CHEBI:30531
ChemSpider	376
DrugBank	DB01856
ECHA InfoCard	100.003.492
EC Number	203-840-8
PubChem CID	385
UNII	BZQ96WX25F
CompTox Dashboard (EPA)	DTXSID5021598
- InChI: InChI=1S/C7H12O4/c8-6(9)4-2-1-3-5-7(10)11/h1-5H2,(H,8,9)(H,10,11) Key: WLJVNTCWHIRURA-UHFFFAOYSA-N; InChI=1/C7H12O4/c8-6(9)4-2-1-3-5-7(10)11/h1-5H2,(H,8,9)(H,10,11) Key: WLJVNTCWHIRURA-UHFFFAOYAR
- SMILES: OC(=O)CCCCCC(=O)O

Properties
Chemical formula	C_{7}H_{12}O_{4}
Molar mass	160.17 g/mol
Appearance	colorless or white solid
Density	1.28 g/cm^{3}
Melting point	103 to 105 °C (217 to 221 °F; 376 to 378 K)
Boiling point	decomposes
Acidity (pK_{a})	4.71 pKa2 = 5.58
- Except where otherwise noted, data are given for materials in their standard state (at 25 °C [77 °F], 100 kPa). verify (what is ?) Infobox references

Pimelic acid is the organic compound with the formula HO_{2}C(CH_{2})_{5}CO_{2}H. Pimelic acid is one CH_{2} unit longer than a related dicarboxylic acid, adipic acid, a precursor to many polyesters and polyamides. However compared to adipic acid, pimelic acid is relatively small in importance industrially. Derivatives of pimelic acid are involved in the biosynthesis of the amino acid lysine and the vitamin biotin.

== Synthesis ==
=== Biosynthesis ===
The biosynthesis of pimelic acid is unknown but is speculated to start with malonyl CoA.

=== Chemical and industrial routes ===
Like other simple dicarboxylic acids, many methods have been developed for producing pimelic acid. Pimelic acid is produced commercially by oxidation of cycloheptanone with dinitrogen tetroxide. Other routes include the relatively unselective oxidation of palmitic acid and the carbonylation of caprolactone.

==== Niche methods ====
Many other methods exist. Pimelic acid has been synthesized from cyclohexanone and from salicylic acid. In the former route, the additional carbon is supplied by dimethyloxalate, which reacts with the enolate.

In other syntheses, pimelic acid is made from cyclohexene-4-carboxylic acid, and a fourth method also exists based on the 1,4 reaction of malonate systems with acrolein.

Several patents exist for the production of pimelic acid.

== See also ==
- Diaminopimelic acid
