= Cyclohexylbenzene =

Names
- Preferred IUPAC name Cyclohexylbenzene
- Other names Phenylhexamethylene Phenylcyclohexane

Identifiers
CAS Number	827-52-1
3D model (JSmol)	Interactive image
ChEMBL	ChEMBL3278514
ChemSpider	12674
ECHA InfoCard	100.011.429
EC Number	212-572-0
PubChem CID	13229
UNII	TRJ2SXT894
CompTox Dashboard (EPA)	DTXSID3061188
- InChI: InChI=1S/C12H16/c1-3-7-11(8-4-1)12-9-5-2-6-10-12/h1,3-4,7-8,12H,2,5-6,9-10H2 Key: IGARGHRYKHJQSM-UHFFFAOYSA-N
- SMILES: C1CCC(CC1)C2=CC=CC=C2

Properties
Chemical formula	C_{12}H_{16}
Molar mass	160.260 g·mol^{−1}
Appearance	Colorless liquid
Density	0.982 g/cm^{3}
Melting point	7.3 °C (45.1 °F; 280.4 K)
Boiling point	240.1 °C (464.2 °F; 513.2 K)

Hazards
- GHS labelling
Pictograms	(GHS07: Exclamation mark) (GHS08: Health hazard) (GHS09: Environmental hazard)
Signal word	Danger
Hazard statements	H302, H304, H315, H319, H410
Precautionary statements	P264, P270, P273, P280, P301+P310, P301+P312, P302+P352, P305+P351+P338, P321, P330, P331, P332+P313, P337+P313, P362, P391, P405, P501
- Except where otherwise noted, data are given for materials in their standard state (at 25 °C [77 °F], 100 kPa). Infobox references

Cyclohexylbenzene is the organic compound with the structural formula C_{6}H_{5}−C_{6}H_{11}. It is a derivative of benzene with a cyclohexyl substituent (C_{6}H_{11}). It is a colorless liquid.

== History and synthesis ==
Cyclohexylbenzene was first obtained in 1899 by Markovnikov's student Nikolay Kirsanov (1874–1921). He used a Friedel–Crafts alkylation of benzene with cyclohexyl chloride using a catalyst such as aluminum trichloride:

C_{6}H_{6} + C_{6}H_{11}Cl → C_{6}H_{5}−C_{6}H_{11} + HCl

Cyclohexylbenzene is now industrially produced by the acid-catalyzed alkylation of benzene with cyclohexene. The process can proceed using benzene as the exclusive organic precursor. Its partial hydrogenation gives cyclohexene, which alkylates the unhydrogenated benzene.

It is also generated by the hydrodesulfurization of dibenzothiophene, and ExxonMobil took a patent in 2009 for a process based on direct hydroalkylation of two benzene molecules.

== Applications ==
A route to phenol analogous to the cumene process begins with cyclohexylbenzene, which is oxidized to a hydroperoxide, akin to the production of cumene hydroperoxide. Via the Hock rearrangement, cyclohexylbenzene hydroperoxide cleaves to give phenol and cyclohexanone:

C_{6}H_{5}−C_{6}H_{10}OOH → C_{6}H_{5}OH + OC_{6}H_{10}

Cyclohexanone is an important precursor to some nylons.
