= Cyclopentanol =

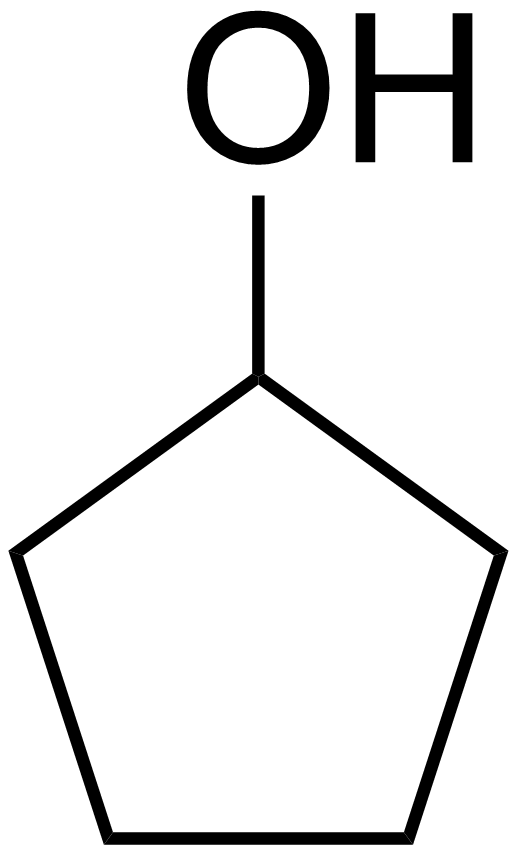

Names
- Preferred IUPAC name Cyclopentanol
- Other names Cyclopentyl alcohol Hydroxycyclopentane

Identifiers
| CAS Number | 96-41-3 |
| 3D model (JSmol) | Interactive image |
| ChEBI | CHEBI:16133 |
| ChEMBL | ChEMBL288998 |
| ChemSpider | 7026 |
| ECHA InfoCard | 100.002.278 |
| EC Number | 202-504-8 |
| KEGG | C02020 |
| PubChem CID | 7298 |
| UNII | 1L43Q07TBU |
| CompTox Dashboard (EPA) | DTXSID1033371 |
- InChI: InChI=1S/C5H10O/c6-5-3-1-2-4-5/h5-6H,1-4H2 Key: XCIXKGXIYUWCLL-UHFFFAOYSA-N
- SMILES: C1CCC(C1)O

Properties
| Chemical formula | C_{5}H_{10}O |
| Molar mass | 86.1323 g/mol |
| Appearance | Colorless liquid |
| Density | 0.949 g/mL |
| Melting point | −19 °C (−2 °F; 254 K) |
| Boiling point | 139 to 140 °C (282 to 284 °F; 412 to 413 K) |
| Magnetic susceptibility (χ) | −64.0·10^{−6} cm^{3}/mol |

Related compounds
| Related compounds | Cyclopropanol; Cyclobutanol; Cyclohexanol; Cycloheptanol; Cyclooctanol; Cyclopentane; Cyclopentene; Cyclopentanone |
- Except where otherwise noted, data are given for materials in their standard state (at 25 °C [77 °F], 100 kPa). verify (what is ?) Infobox references

Cyclopentanol or cyclopentyl alcohol is the organic compound with the formula (CH_{2})_{4}CHOH. It is classified as a cyclic alcohol.

== Synthesis and reactions ==
The bio-derived "platform chemical" furfural can be efficiently converted to cyclopentanol by hydrodeoxygenation using a copper catalyst. or a nickelcobalt catalyst.

Cyclopentanol can then be easily dehydrated to cyclopentene, which in turn can be converted to cyclopentyl methyl ether.

Cyclopentanol is an intermediate in the oxidation of cyclopentene to cyclopentanone.
