= Bencyclane =

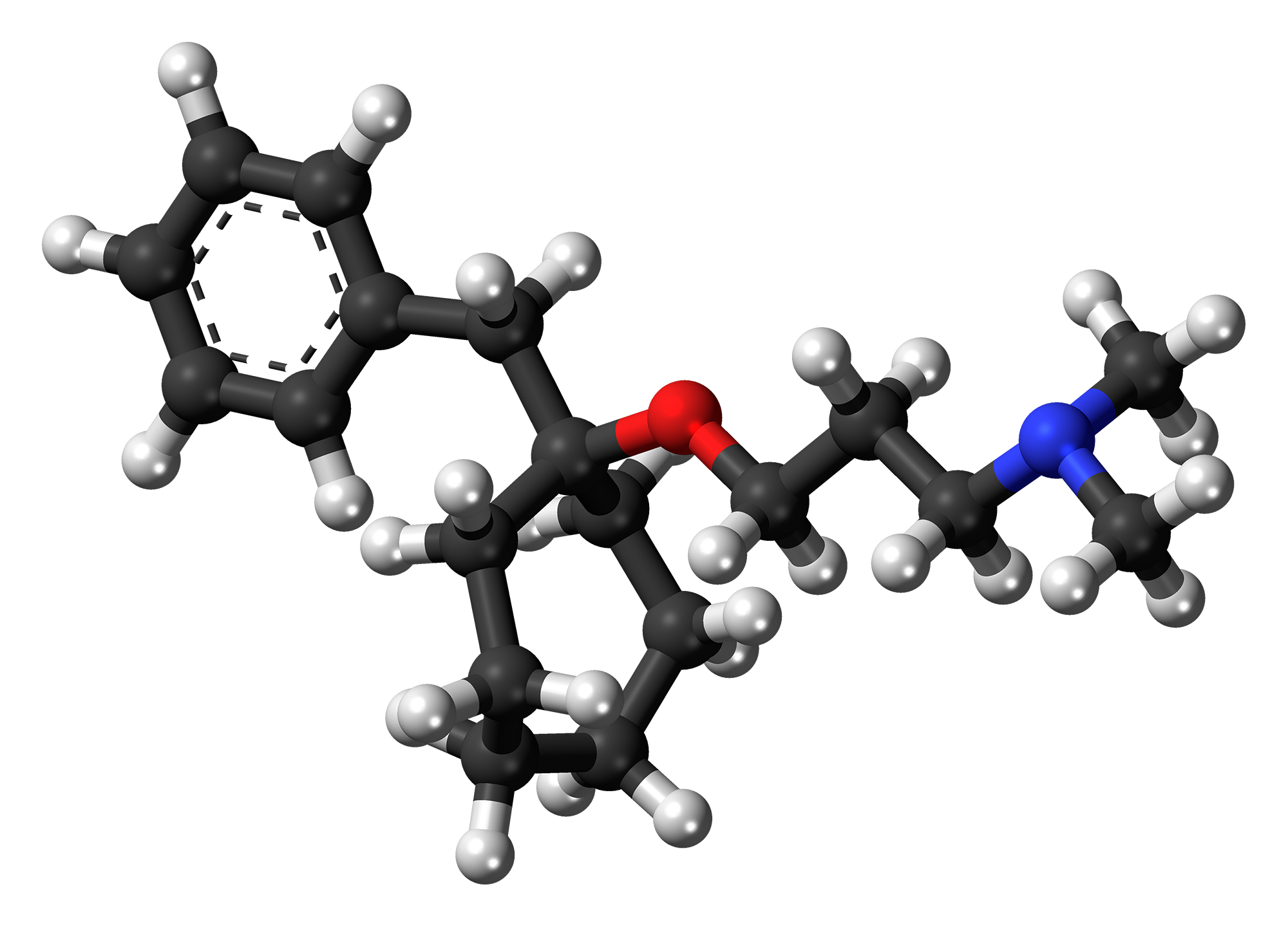

Names
- IUPAC name 3-[(1-benzylcycloheptyl)oxy]-N,N-dimethylpropan-1-amine

Identifiers
CAS Number	2179-37-5
3D model (JSmol)	Interactive image
ChEMBL	ChEMBL2110767
ChemSpider	2222
ECHA InfoCard	100.016.861
PubChem CID	2312
UNII	6I97Z6S135
CompTox Dashboard (EPA)	DTXSID0022646
- InChI: InChI=1S/C19H31NO/c1-20(2)15-10-16-21-19(13-8-3-4-9-14-19)17-18-11-6-5-7-12-18/h5-7,11-12H,3-4,8-10,13-17H2,1-2H3 Key: FYJJXENSONZJRG-UHFFFAOYSA-N; InChI=1/C19H31NO/c1-20(2)15-10-16-21-19(13-8-3-4-9-14-19)17-18-11-6-5-7-12-18/h5-7,11-12H,3-4,8-10,13-17H2,1-2H3 Key: FYJJXENSONZJRG-UHFFFAOYAM
- SMILES: O(CCCN(C)C)C1(CCCCCC1)Cc2ccccc2

Properties
Chemical formula	C_{19}H_{31}NO
Molar mass	289.45554

Pharmacology
ATC code	C04AX11 (WHO)
- Except where otherwise noted, data are given for materials in their standard state (at 25 °C [77 °F], 100 kPa). verify (what is ?) Infobox references

Bencyclane is an antispasmodic, vasodilator, and platelet aggregation inhibitor.

== Synthesis ==
Synthesis: Patents:

Grignard addition of benzylmagnesiumbromide to suberone would give 1-benzylcycloheptanol [4006-73-9] (1'). Williamson ether synthesis with 3-dimethylaminopropylchloride [109-54-6] (2) completed the synthesis of bencyclane (3).

== See also ==
- Clofenciclan
