= Cyclopropanol =

Names
- Preferred IUPAC name Cyclopropanol
- Other names Cyclopropyl alcohol, Hydroxycyclopropane

Identifiers
CAS Number	16545-68-9
3D model (JSmol)	Interactive image
ChemSpider	109961
ECHA InfoCard	100.217.724
PubChem CID	123361
UNII	TK7N9F9R3Y
CompTox Dashboard (EPA)	DTXSID40167949
- InChI: InChI=1S/C3H6O/c4-3-1-2-3/h3-4H,1-2H2 Key: YOXHCYXIAVIFCZ-UHFFFAOYSA-N
- SMILES: OC1CC1

Properties
Chemical formula	C_{3}H_{6}O
Molar mass	58.080 g·mol^{−1}
Density	0.917 g/mL
Boiling point	101 to 102 °C (214 to 216 °F; 374 to 375 K)

Related compounds
Related compounds	Cyclobutanol; Cyclopentanol; Cyclohexanol; Cycloheptanol; Cyclooctanol
- Except where otherwise noted, data are given for materials in their standard state (at 25 °C [77 °F], 100 kPa). verify (what is ?) Infobox references

Cyclopropanol is an organic compound with the chemical formula C_{3}H_{6}O or (CH_{3})_{2}CHOH. It contains a cyclopropyl group with a hydroxyl group attached to it. The compound is highly unstable due to the three-membered ring, and is susceptible to reactions that open the ring. It is highly prone to rearrangement, undergoing structural isomerization to form propanal. This property is useful synthetically: cyclopropanol can be used as a synthon for the homoenolate of propanal. The chemical is also useful as a reagent to introduce a cyclopropyl group into ester, sulfate, and amine linkages. The resulting cyclopropyl-containing compounds have been used in investigations of potential antiviral drugs and of modulators of protein trafficking.
