= Cyclohexanone =

Skeletal formula of cyclohexanone
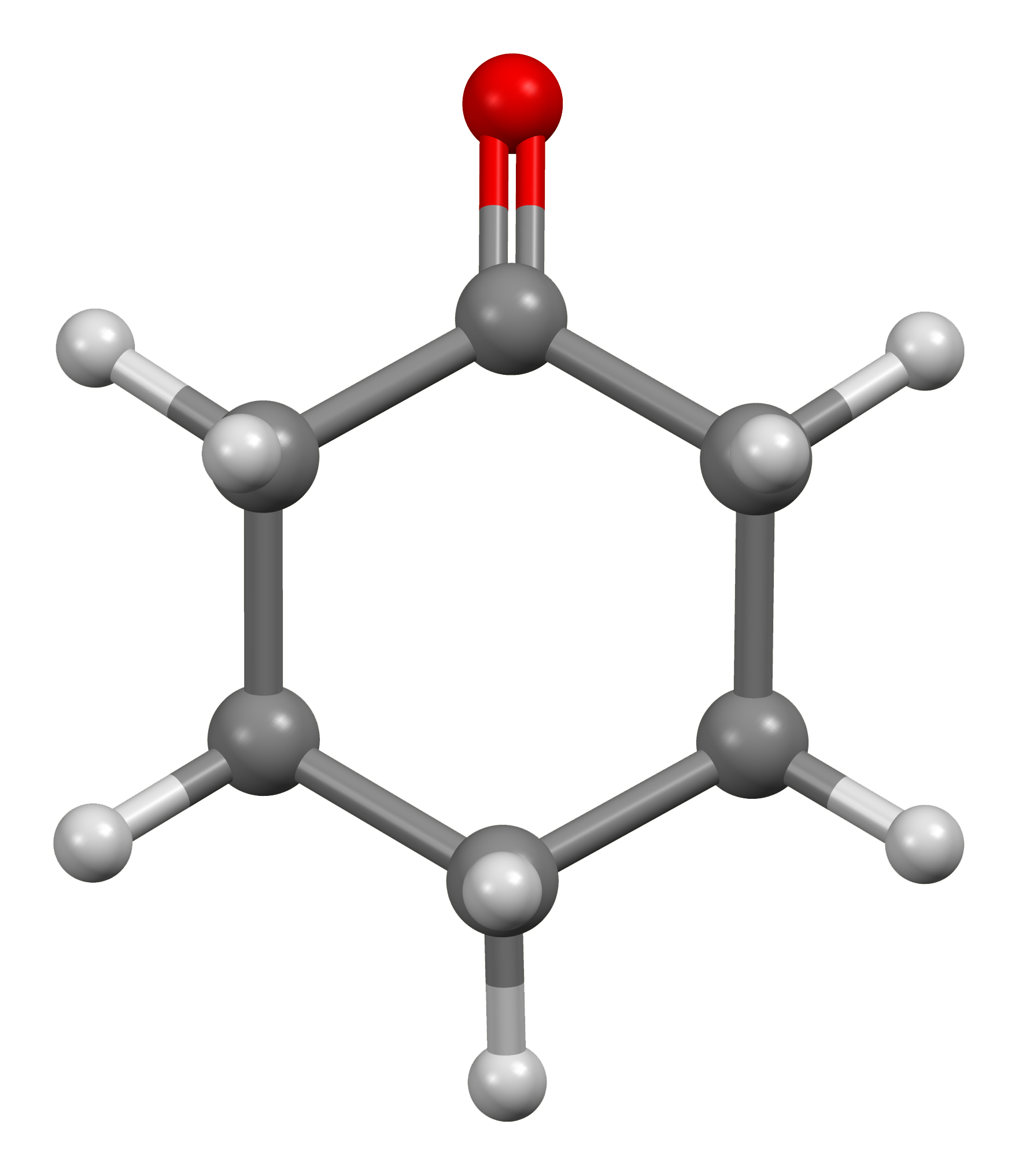
Ball-and-stick model of cyclohexanone
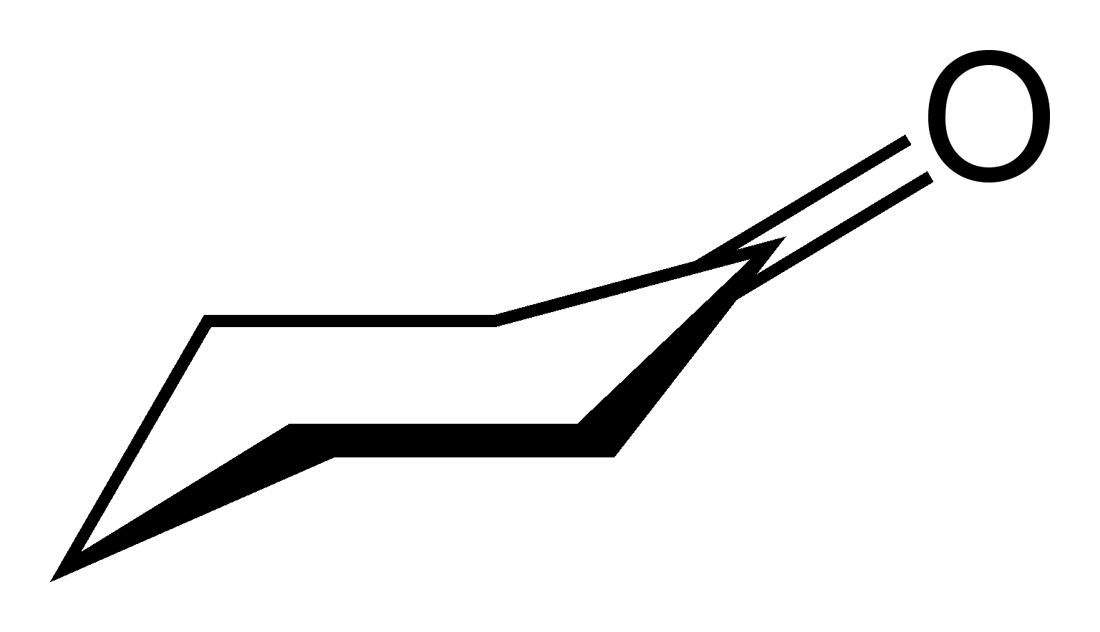
Skeletal formula viewed side-on, showing the non-planar conformation
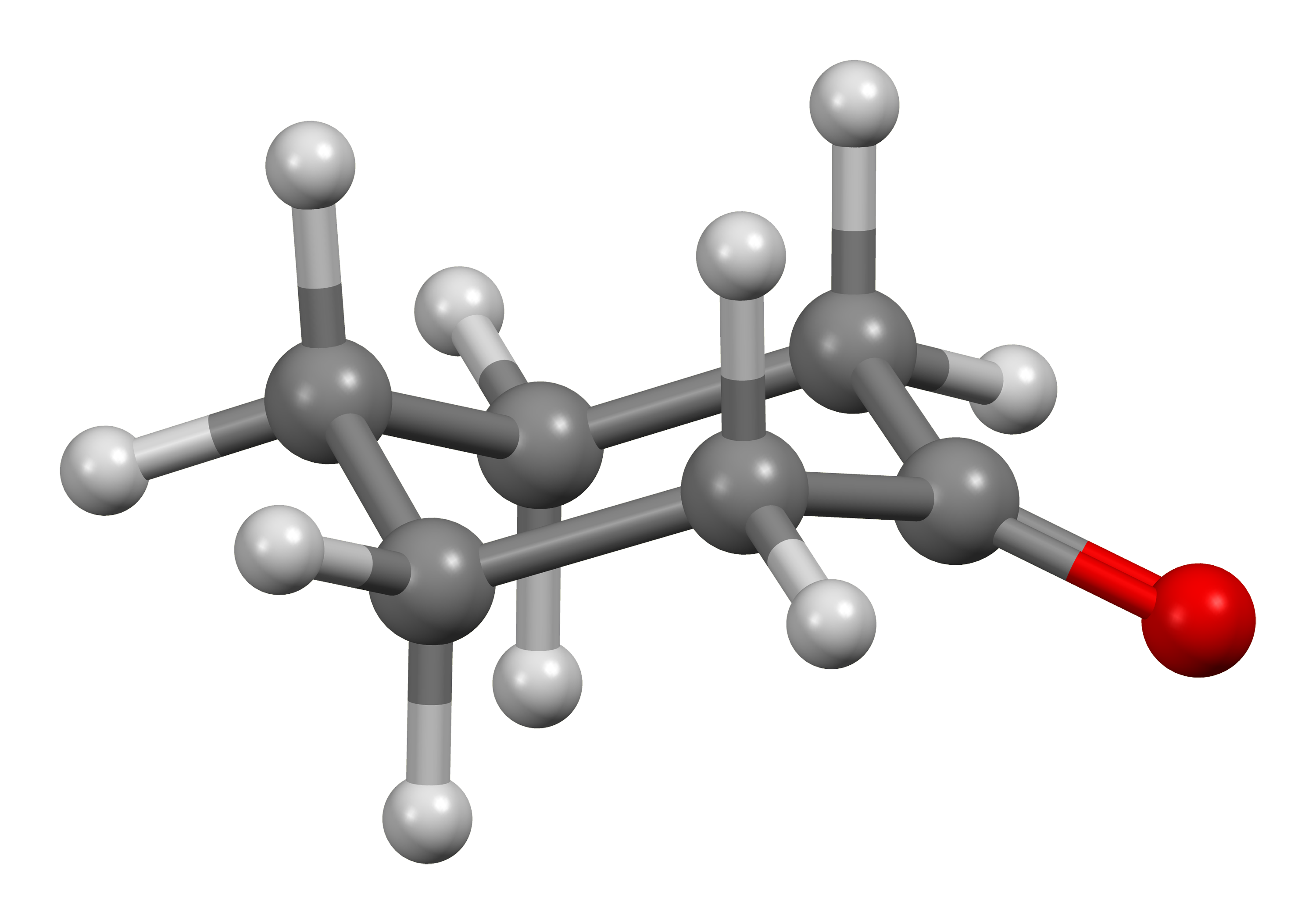
Ball-and-stick model of cyclohexanone viewed side-on, showing the non-planar conformation

Names
- Preferred IUPAC name Cyclohexanone
- Other names oxocyclohexane, pimelic ketone, ketohexamethylene, cyclohexyl ketone, ketocyclohexane, hexanon, Hydrol-O, Sextone, K, Anone

Identifiers
CAS Number	108-94-1
3D model (JSmol)	Interactive image
ChEBI	CHEBI:17854
ChEMBL	ChEMBL18850
ChemSpider	7679
DrugBank	DB02060
ECHA InfoCard	100.003.302
EC Number	203-631-1
KEGG	C00414
PubChem CID	7967
UNII	5QOR3YM052
CompTox Dashboard (EPA)	DTXSID6020359
- InChI: InChI=1S/C6H10O/c7-6-4-2-1-3-5-6/h1-5H2 Key: JHIVVAPYMSGYDF-UHFFFAOYSA-N; InChI=1/C6H10O/c7-6-4-2-1-3-5-6/h1-5H2 Key: JHIVVAPYMSGYDF-UHFFFAOYAY
- SMILES: C1CCC(=O)CC1

Properties
Chemical formula	C_{6}H_{10}O
Molar mass	98.145 g·mol^{−1}
Appearance	Colorless liquid
Odor	Peppermint or acetone-like
Density	0.9478 g/mL, liquid
Melting point	−47 °C (−53 °F; 226 K)
Boiling point	155.65 °C (312.17 °F; 428.80 K)
Solubility in water	8.6 g/100 mL (20 °C)
Solubility in all organic solvents	Miscible
log P	0.81
Vapor pressure	5 mmHg (20 °C)
Magnetic susceptibility (χ)	−62.04·10^{−6} cm^{3}/mol
Refractive index (n_{D})	1.447
Viscosity	2.02 cP at 25 °C

Thermochemistry
Std molar entropy (S^{⦵}_{298})	+229.03 J·K^{−1}·mol^{−1}
Std enthalpy of formation (Δ_{f}H^{⦵}_{298})	−270.7 kJ·mol^{−1}
Std enthalpy of combustion (Δ_{c}H^{⦵}_{298})	−3519.3 kJ·mol^{−1}

Hazards
- GHS labelling
Pictograms	(GHS02: Flammable) (GHS05: Corrosive) (GHS07: Exclamation mark)
Signal word	Danger
Hazard statements	H226, H302, H305, H312, H315, H318, H332
Precautionary statements	P280, P305+P351+P338
NFPA 704 (fire diamond)	1 2 0
Flash point	44 °C (111 °F; 317 K)
Autoignition temperature	420 °C (788 °F; 693 K)
Explosive limits	1.1–9.4%
- Lethal dose or concentration (LD, LC)
LD_{50} (median dose)	1200 mg/kg (cat, orally); 2362 mg/kg (rat, orally)
LC_{50} (median concentration)	8000 ppm (rat, 4 hr)
LC_{Lo} (lowest published)	4706 ppm (mouse, 1.5 hr)
- NIOSH (US health exposure limits)
PEL (Permissible)	TWA 50 ppm (200 mg/m^{3})
REL (Recommended)	TWA 25 ppm (100 mg/m^{3}) [skin]
IDLH (Immediate danger)	700 ppm

Related compounds
Related ketones	Cyclopentanone, cycloheptanone
Related compounds	Cyclohexanol
- Except where otherwise noted, data are given for materials in their standard state (at 25 °C [77 °F], 100 kPa). verify (what is ?) Infobox references

Cyclohexanone is the organic compound with the formula (CH_{2})_{5}CO. The molecule consists of six-carbon cyclic molecule with a ketone functional group. This colorless oily liquid has a sweet odor reminiscent of benzaldehyde. Over time, samples of cyclohexanone assume a pale yellow color.

Cyclohexanone is slightly soluble in water and miscible with common organic solvents. Millions of tonnes are produced annually, mainly as a precursor to nylon.

== History and synthesis ==
The compound was discovered by Edmund Drechsel in 1888 among the products of AC electrolysis of slightly acidified water solutions of phenol. He named it hydrophenoketone and correctly suggested that phenol was first hydrogenated by electrolytic hydrogen to cyclohexanol, which he wasn't able to isolate, and then oxidized by electrolytic oxygen.

=== Laboratory synthesis ===
Cyclohexanone can be prepared from cyclohexanol by oxidation with chromium trioxide (Jones oxidation). An alternative method utilizes the safer and more readily available oxidant sodium hypochlorite.

=== Industrial production ===
Cyclohexanone is produced by the oxidation of cyclohexane in air, typically using cobalt catalysts:

C_{6}H_{12} + O_{2} → (CH_{2})_{5}CO + H_{2}O

This process forms cyclohexanol as a by-product, and this mixture, called "KA Oil" for ketone-alcohol oil, is the main feedstock for the production of adipic acid. The oxidation involves radicals and the hydroperoxide C_{6}H_{11}O_{2}H as an intermediate. In some cases, purified cyclohexanol, obtained by hydration of cyclohexene, is the precursor. Alternatively, cyclohexanone can be produced by the partial hydrogenation of phenol:

C_{6}H_{5}OH + 2 H_{2} → (CH_{2})_{5}CO

This process can also be adjusted to favor the formation of cyclohexanol.

ExxonMobil developed a process in which benzene is hydroalkylated to cyclohexylbenzene. This latter product is oxidized to a hydroperoxide and then cleaved into phenol and cyclohexanone. Therefore, this newer process without producing the acetone by-product appears attractive and is similar to the cumene process as a hydroperoxide is formed and then decomposed to yield two key products.

== Uses ==
The great majority of cyclohexanone is consumed in the production of precursors to Nylon 6,6 and Nylon 6. About half of the world's supply is converted to adipic acid, one of two precursors for nylon 6,6. For this application, the KA oil (see above) is oxidized with nitric acid. The other half of the cyclohexanone supply is converted to cyclohexanone oxime. In the presence of sulfuric acid catalyst, the oxime rearranges to caprolactam, a precursor to nylon 6:

=== Other reactions ===
In addition to the large scale reactions conducted in service of the polymer industry, many reactions have been developed for cyclohexanone.

In the presence of light, it undergoes alpha-chlorination to give 2-chlorocyclohexanone. It forms a trimethylsilylenol ether upon treatment with trimethylsilylchloride in the presence of base.

It forms an enamine with pyrrolidine.

Self condensation of cyclohexanone gives cyclohexenylcyclohexanone. The latter undergoes dehydrogenation to give 2-phenylphenol.

Treatment with nitrosyl chloride and ethanol in sulfur dioxide gives the oximinecarboxylic ester:

(CH_{2})_{5}CO + C_{2}H_{5}OH + NOCl → HON=CH(CH_{2})_{4}CO_{2}C_{2}H_{5} + HCl

=== Flavor use ===
Cyclohexanone is FEMA GRAS and is used in small quantities as a raw material for flavors. It is said to have a minty, cooling flavor.

=== Illicit use ===
Cyclohexanone has been used in the illicit production of phencyclidine and its analogs and is often subject to purchase restrictions, such as being listed on the Special Surveillance List in the US.

== Safety ==
Like cyclohexanol, cyclohexanone is not carcinogenic and is moderately toxic, with a TLV of 25 ppm for the vapor. It is an irritant.
