= Neurolixis =

American pharmaceutical company

- Industry: Biopharmaceuticals
- Founded: 2011
- Headquarters: United States
- Key people: Mark A. Varney, Adrian Newman-Tancredi
- Website: https://www.neurolixis.com/en/

Neurolixis is a biopharmaceutical company focused on novel drugs for the treatment of human central nervous system diseases.

Neurolixis Inc. was founded in 2011 by Mark A. Varney and Adrian Newman-Tancredi. The company's therapeutic focus is on CNS disorders including Parkinson's disease, neurological orphan disorders, depression and cognitive deficits. The company has offices in USA and in France.

In September 2013, Neurolixis in-licensed two clinical-phase drugs, befiradol and F-15599 from Pierre Fabre Laboratories, a French pharmaceutical company. Befiradol (also known as NLX-112) is targeted to the treatment of movement disorders, notably dyskinesia in Parkinson's disease, whereas F-15599 (also known as NLX-101) is intended for the treatment of autism spectrum disorders including Rett syndrome and Fragile X syndrome. In addition, Neurolixis is developing its own novel chemical entities (NCEs), notably NLX-204 (see below).

== Development of befiradol (NLX-112) ==
Neurolixis has been awarded a series of research grants by the Michael J. Fox Foundation and by Parkinson's UK. Neurolixis undertook research examining the effects of novel, highly selective and efficacious serotonergic drugs targeting 5-HT_{1A} receptors in brain regions relevant to therapeutic properties in Parkinson's disease. The Michael J. Fox Foundation subsequently announced that it was supporting proof-of-principle studies on befiradol (also known as NLX-112) in models of Parkinson's disease and showcased Neurolixis in its Partnering Program. In January 2018, the British charity Parkinson's UK announced that it had awarded Neurolixis a grant to advance development of befiradol up to clinical phase in Parkinson's disease patients. In March 2019, Neurolixis announced that the US Food and Drug Administration (FDA) gave a positive response to Neurolixis' Investigational New Drug (IND) application for befiradol to be tested in a Phase 2 clinical study in Parkinson's disease patients with troublesome Levodopa-induced dyskinesia. Studies published in 2020 using non-human primate models of Parkinson's disease, (MPTP-treated marmosets and MPTP-treated macaques), found that befiradol potently reduced Levodopa-induced dyskinesia at oral doses as low as 0.1 to 0.4 mg/kg.

On 22 November 2020, The Sunday Times reported that the two charities, Parkinson's UK and Michael J. Fox Foundation, were jointly investing $2 million to support a clinical trial on befiradol in Parkinson's disease patients with troublesome Levodopa-induced dyskinesia, a potentially "life changing" drug. On 23 November 2020, Parkinson's UK and Michael J. Fox Foundation, confirmed their funding in an official announcement. Neurolixis announced on 30 November 2021 the start of patient recruitment in a Phase 2A clinical trial to investigate the safety, tolerability and preliminary efficacy of NLX-112 versus placebo in L-dopa-induced dyskinesia in Parkinson's disease patients. On 20 March 2023, Neurolixis, Parkinson's UK and Michael J. Fox Foundation announced that the clinical trial had met its primary endpoint of safety and tolerability, and also the secondary endpoint of efficacy in reducing Levodopa-induced dyskinesia.

In other studies, befiradol showed pro-motility activity in a transgenic nematode worm model of spinocerebellar ataxia type 3 (also known as SCA3 or Machado-Joseph disease), an orphan disorder. In July 2024, the European Commission granted Neurolixis Orphan Drug Designation for befiradol as a treatment of Spinocerebellar Ataxia based on these data and on results from a transgenic mouse model of Spinocerebellar Ataxia.

Befiradol also reversed depression-like behavior and catalepsy induced by tetrabenazine, a drug used for the treatment of Huntington's disease.

== Development of F-15599 ==
F-15599 (also known as NLX-101) was awarded Orphan Drug Status by the United States Food and Drug Administration (FDA) in October 2013 and Orphan Medicinal Product designation by the European Medicines Agency in March 2014. In collaboration with researchers at the University of Bristol, Neurolixis was awarded a grant by the International Rett Syndrome Foundation to study F-15599 in animal models of Rett syndrome. In June 2015, Neurolixis was awarded a grant by the Rett Syndrome Research Trust to advance F-15599 to clinical development. Subsequent studies on F-15599 investigated its functional selectivity (also referred to as 'biased agonism') at cortical serotonin 5-HT_{1A} receptors using brain imaging techniques in rat: functional magnetic resonance imaging and positron emission tomography. The functional selectivity of F-15599 was considered to underlie its rapid-acting antidepressant-like activity in the 'chronic mild stress' (CMS) model of depression. F-15599 reversed CMS-induced anhedonia (measured as a deficit in sucrose solution consumption) after a single day of treatment. More recently, Neurolixis has broadened its characterization of F-15599 to other autism spectrum disorders, notably Fragile X syndrome. Researchers at the University of California, Riverside showed that F-15599 protected transgenic Fragile X syndrome mice from audiogenic seizures and death. These observations constituted the basis for a patent (US11974992B2] that was granted to Neurolixis by the United States Patent and Trademark Office. The potential therapeutic utility of F-15599 for treatment of Central nervous system disorders involving serotonin systems was recently supported by a study at the Brain and Mind Research Institute at the University of Ottawa showing that the compound exerts rapid reorganization of serotonin projections in a transgenic mouse model.

== Preclinical drug discovery ==
In addition to developing befiradol and F-15599, Neurolixis is also developing its own novel chemical entities (NCEs) in collaboration with a team at Jagiellonian University in Krakow, Poland. Scientists from Neurolixis and Jagiellonian University filed a patent application on the NCEs in 2016, and it issued in the USA under patent number US10562853B2. The NCEs are selective serotonin 5-HT_{1A} receptor agonists that show functional selectivity for either extracellular signal-regulated kinases activation or for beta arrestin activation. It has been suggested that such compounds may have utility for treatment of distinct CNS disorders. In particular, NLX-204 shows preferential activation of extracellular signal-regulated kinases and exhibits rapid-acting antidepressant-like activity in rodent models.
