= Scott McDonald (disambiguation) =

Scott McDonald (born 1983) is an Australian soccer player.

Scott McDonald or Scott MacDonald may also refer to:

- Scott MacDonald (actor) (born 1959), American actor
- Scott McDonald (athletic director), director of athletics for the University of Louisiana at Monroe
- Scott MacDonald (musician), member of the Canadian band Spoons
- Scott McDonald (curler) (born 1986), Canadian curler
- Scott McDonald (CEO) (born 1967), chief executive of the British Council
- Scott MacDonald (media scholar) (born 1942), American media scholar
- Scott MacDonald (philosopher) (born 1956), American philosopher
