= Alan Gemmell =

British diplomat and politician

Alan Gemmell OBE MP FRSA
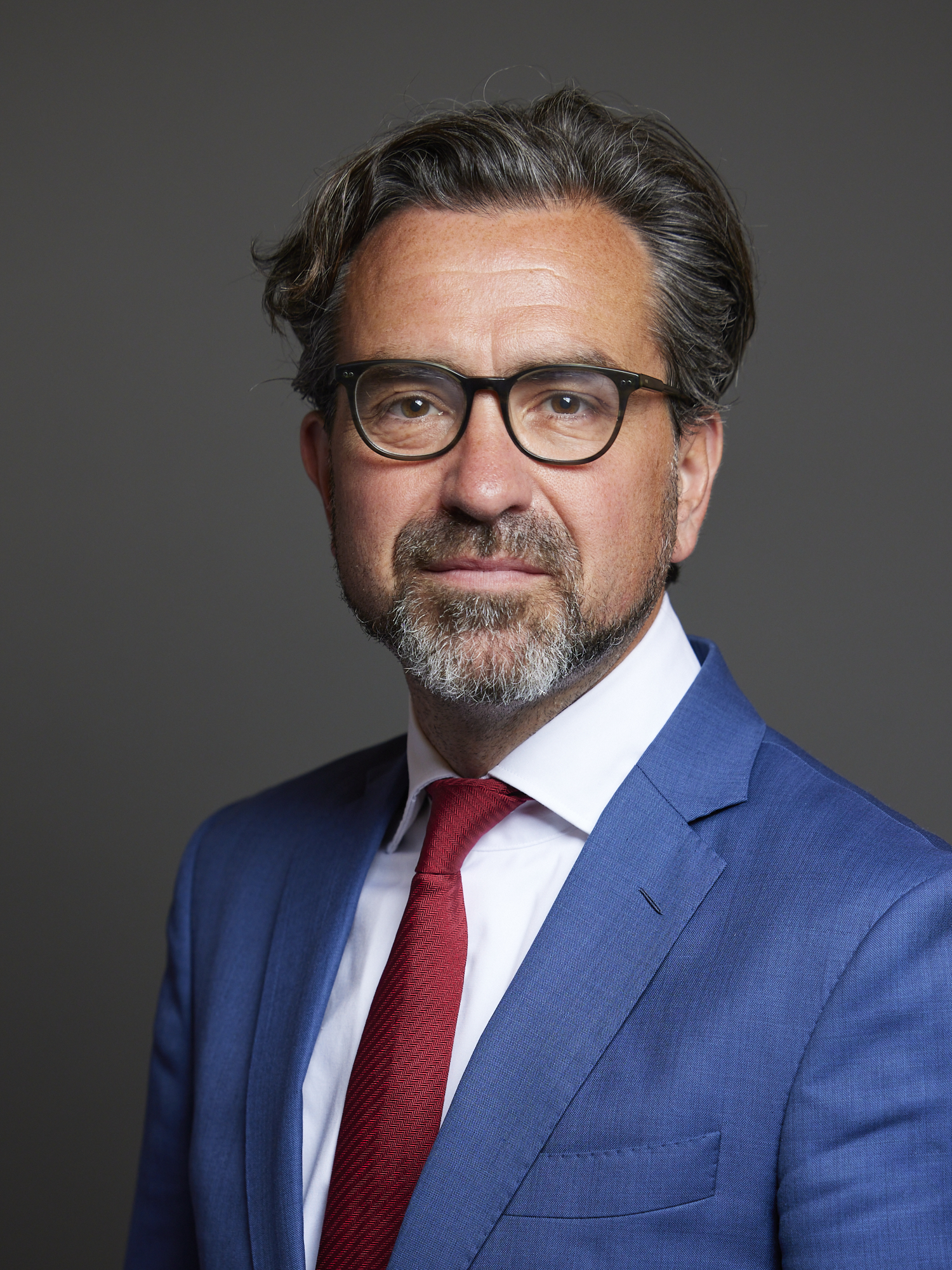
- Official portrait, 2024

Member of Parliament for Central Ayrshire
- Incumbent
- Assumed office 4 July 2024
- Preceded by: Philippa Whitford
- Majority: 6,869 (16.6%)

Personal details
- Born: 6 April 1978 (age 48)
- Party: Labour
- Spouse: Damien Lee Stirk (m. 2015)
- Education: University of Glasgow

Alan Gemmell (born 6 April 1978) is a Scottish Labour Party politician and diplomat, who has served as the member of parliament (MP) for Central Ayrshire since 2024.

He is co-founder of FiveFilms4Freedom and a former director of the British Council in India. Gemmel was appointed as Chief Executive of the Commonwealth Enterprise and Investment Council in December 2018.

== Early life and career ==
Gemmell attended Irvine Royal Academy and the Royal Scottish Academy of Music and Drama's (RSAMD) junior school. He studied piano and trombone at the RSAMD, and toured with the Scottish National Youth Orchestra. He read law at the University of Glasgow.

Gemmell worked for the civil service from 2003 to 2007. He was private secretary to the Home Office permanent secretary, John Gieve, from 2003 to 2005. He was the Home Office director for economic migration from 2005 until 2006, when he became a counter radicalisation advisor in the Cabinet Office.

== British Council career ==
Gemmell has served as director of the British Council in India, as well as director for Israel from 2012 to 2016; deputy director for Mexico (2011–2012); in São Paulo, Brazil (2011); and, as director of external relations, London (2008–2011).

He established a university scholarship programme for women in 2018, awarding 100 Indians funding for a one-year STEM master's degree at British universities. He launched the Changing Moves, Changing Minds campaign to promote cricket amongst young girls.

In 2018, he hosted a lunch for tens of thousands to celebrate the 70th anniversary of the British Council in India. He also commissioned Sarah Eberle to create the first British Council garden at the 2018 Chelsea Flower Show its anniversary.

=== State engagement ===
Gemmell signed an agreement with the Delhi government to improve the English-Language skills of over 10,000 young people in the state. Gemmell signed an agreement with the state of Maharashtra to train 30,000 teachers benefiting 1.5 million children across the state. Gemmell secure a partnership with the state of Andhra Pradesh and its chief minister Chandrababu Naidu, to train 100,000 college students. Gemmell signed an agreement witnessesd by Hon'ble Chief Minister Naveen Patnaik to support English teaching across the state and improve the skills of young people in Odisha.

Gemmell has led a focus on Northeast India signing an agreement with the North Eastern Council of the Ministry for Development of North Eastern Region of the Government of India. The North Eastern Council partnership enabled the British Council to develop new partnership and education programmes across the North East.

Gemmell signed an agreement with the state of Arunachal Pradesh in the presence of Hon'ble Chief Minister Pema Khandu at the Tawang Festival in October 2018 to develop cultural and educational programmes. Gemmell signed an agreement with the Government of Sikkim to develop similar initiatives.

=== UK-India Year of Culture ===
Gemmell was responsible for the 2017 UK-India Year of Culture, a year of cultural exchange announced by Prime Minister Narendra Modi on his November 2015 visit to the UK. British prime minister Theresa May and Indian prime minister Modi referenced the Year of Culture and its unprecedented level of cultural exchange in the Joint Statement to mark the visit of PM Modi to London in April 2018.

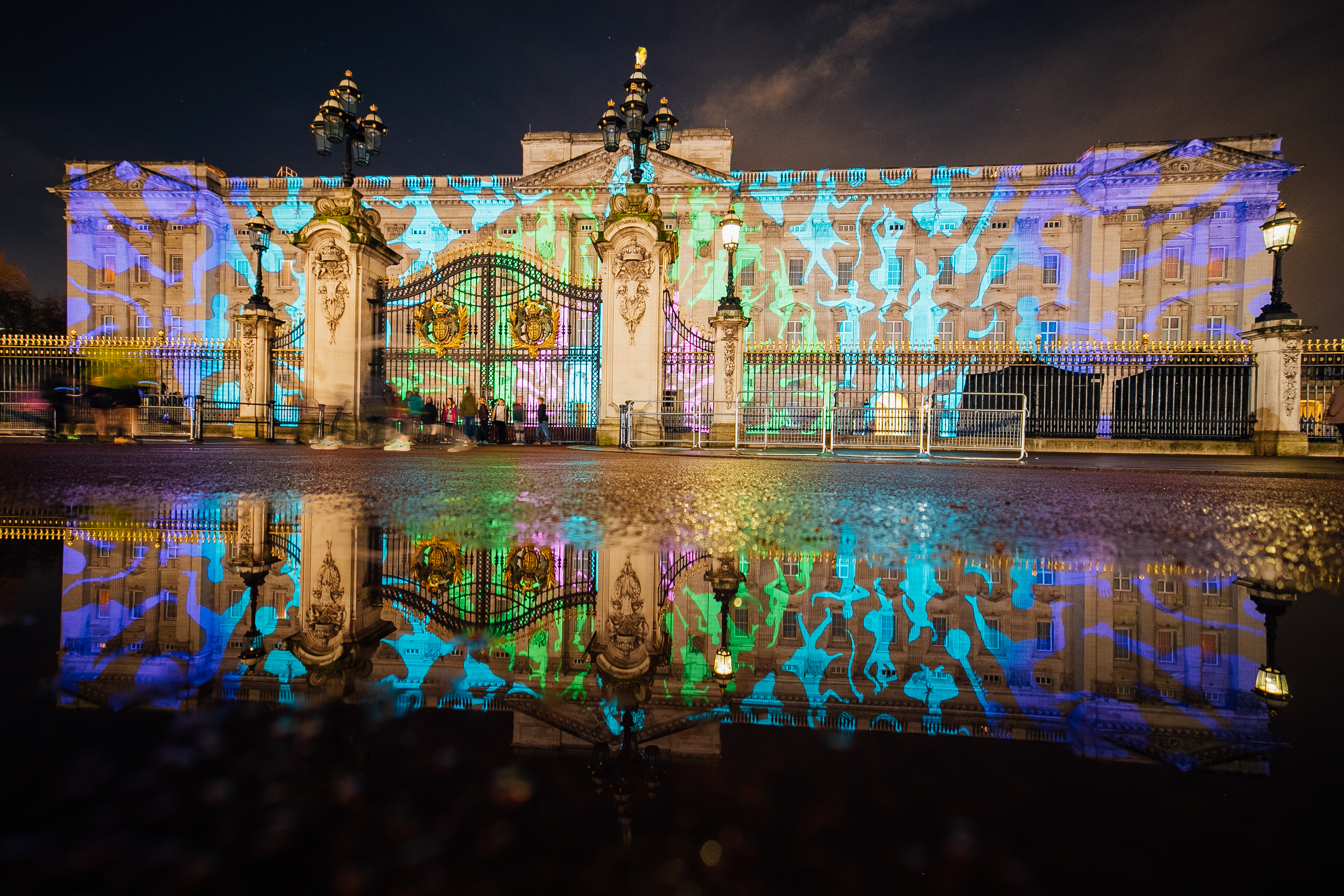
UK-India Year of Culture official launch

Her Majesty The Queen hosted the official launch of the year on 27 February 2017 at Buckingham Palace with Indian finance minister Arun Jaitley representing Prime Minister Modi. Gemmell worked with the Palace, British Indian start-up Studio Carrom and 2017 Creative Director Ruth Ur to project a peacock, India's national bird, onto the facade of Buckingham Palace.

The programme for the year was announced by British Council Deputy Chair Rt Hon Baroness Prashar CBE PC, UK Minister of State for Digital and Culture Rt Hon Matt Hancock and Indian High Commissioner to the United Kingdom HE Mr Sinha at the British Film Institute on 28 February 2017. The programme includes an exhibition from the British Museum and The Chhatrapati Shivaji Maharaj Vastu Sangrahalaya in Mumbai, the first exhibition on Indian innovation at the UK's Science Museum, London, and the restoration of 1928 Indian movie, Shiraz, by the British Film Institute with a new score by British-Indian musician Anoushka Shankar.

=== Mix the City ===
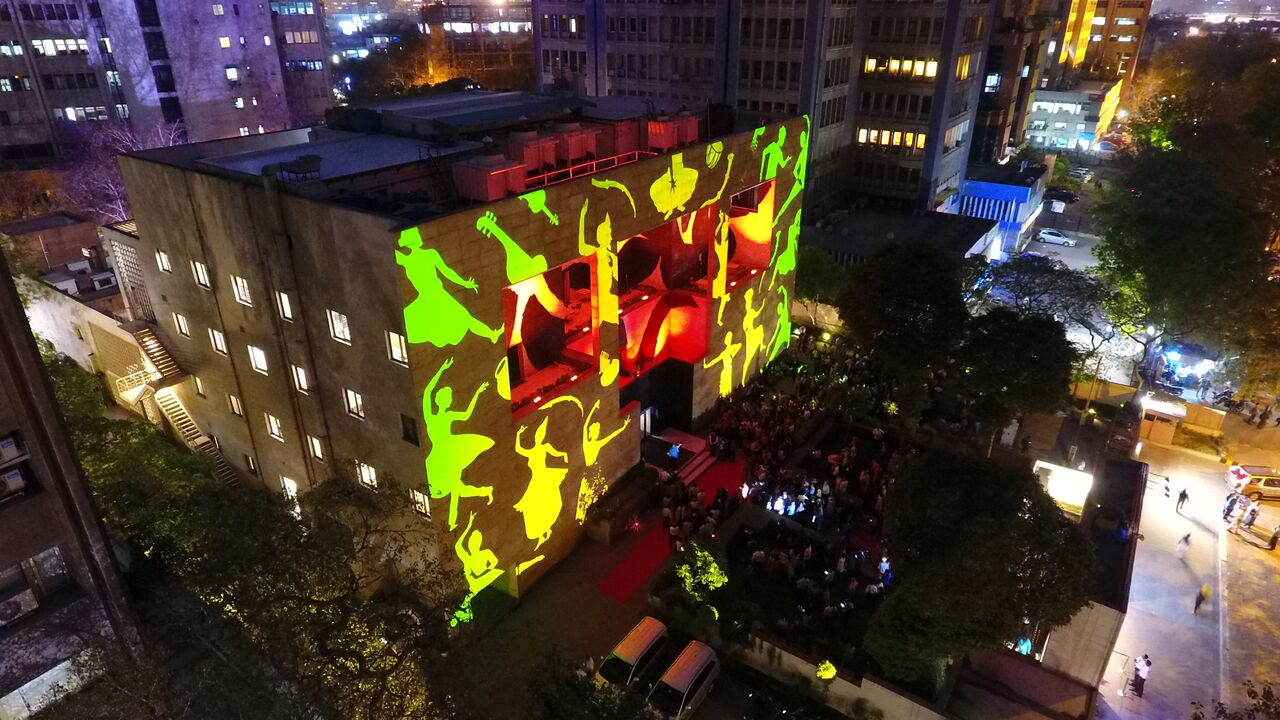
British Council Delhi launch of Mix the City Delhi, 6 April 2017

Gemmell inaugurated the Year of Culture in India on 6 April 2017 projecting elements of the Buckingham Palace Studio Carrom peacock onto the British Council's Delhi building and launching Mix the City Delhi. Gemmell commissioned Mix the City in 2015 working with UK tech start-ups Flying Object and Roll Studio, the BBC and the Arts Council of England. Mix the city is the British Council's first interactive art work. For the Year of Culture, Gemmell commissioned Mix the City in India's 4 main cities Chennai, Delhi, Kolkata and Mumbai. Gemmell launched Mix the City Mumbai in partnership with Rolling Stone India at a Music Expo hosted by the UK Government's Department of International Trade on 31 March 2017. He launched Mix the City Northeast in February 2018 at IIT Guwahati's student festival Alcheringa.

=== Mix the Play ===
In November 2016 Gemmell launched Mix the Play, an interactive digital theatre collaboration with Indian director Roysten Abel, during the visit of British prime minister Theresa May to India. Mix the Play allows users to direct Adil Hussain Kalki Koechlin, Kriti Pant and Tushar Pandey in the balcony scene of Shakespeare's Romeo and Juliet. Mix the Play was part of the U.K. Government's commemoration of the 400th anniversary of the death of Shakespeare. Mix the Play was again developed with Flying Object and Roll Studio.

=== Mix the Body ===
In October 2017 Gemmell launched Mix the Body, an interactive dance platform with British choreographer Wayne McGregor. Mix the Body lets users create a unique dance performance on their mobiles using dancers from McGregor's company Studio Wayne McGregor and Bangalore-based Attakkalri. Users can set their dance to the music of British composers Max Richter and Jon Hopkins. Thus is the third interactive art work created with Flying Object and Roll Studio. The Mix series have been experienced by over 1.5 million people from 200 countries.

=== fiveFilms4freedom ===
In 2015 Gemmell co-founded fiveFilms4freedom, an online, free, 10-day LGBT film festival promoting freedom, equality and LGBT rights, with the British Film Institute and the UN Free & Equal Campaign. The initiative was seen in 135 countries.

The second fiveFilms4freedom ran from 16 to 27 March 2016. The initiative was seen in 179 countries. In 2016 Gemmell also launched a Global List of people promoting LGBT rights.

For the fourth fiveFilms4freedom Gemmell developed a partnership with Indian mobile network operator Jio and selected the first Indian short film, Goddess, by director Karishma Dev Dube. 2.8 million people in India viewed the film on Jio's network.

=== Academic Exchange Partnership ===
Gemmell secured £7 million from British and international medical research foundations for the BIRAX RMI programme through partnerships with Parkinson's UK, JDRF, the MS Society and British Heart Foundation. BIRAX RMI has funded 15 research collaborations between scientists in Britain and Israel including a collaboration to develop a breath test for Parkinson's disease. The BIRAX programme has been supported by the prime ministers of Britain and Israel.

=== Middle East Water Research Programme ===
Gemmell created the UK's first multi-lateral water research programme in the Middle East – a platform for scientists from across the region to work together with British scientists to tackle critical water issues. Five research projects were announced in April 2016 involving water researchers from Israel, the Occupied Palestinian Territories, Gaza, Morocco, Jordan and the UK. Gemmell also created a scholarship programme for water technology and health graduates of Palestinian universities to study full PhDs at Israeli universities.

== Commissioner career ==
In 2020, Gemmell was appointed as British Trade Commissioner and Deputy High Commissioner for South Asia.

He was responsible for over 100 employees as trade commissioner, and tasked with increasing UK-India trade. He secured a reduction on Scotch whisky duty in the state of Maharashtra, and co-chaired the UK's second trade policy dialogue with Bangladesh.

As deputy high commissioner, Gemmell initiated a joint mission to progress of the trial of a murdered British-Irish citizen in Goa. He established an annual commemoration for Percy Norris, the former British High Commissioner to Bombay, who was assassinated in the 1980s.

In 2023, Gemmell represented Britain at the inaugural commemoration of the 1942 sinking of the SS Tilawa in India. He also met with the Maharashtra state government to discuss loaning India Shivaji's 17th century swords.

== Political career ==
Gemmell is a member of the Labour Party and was their parliamentary candidate for Central Ayrshire at the 2024 general election. He won the seat, gaining it from the Scottish National Party.

In the Starmer ministry, Gemmell serves as Parliamentary private secretary to the Foreign Secretary.

In November 2024, Gemmell voted in favour of the Terminally Ill Adults (End of Life) Bill, which proposes to legalise assisted suicide.

== Personal life and honours ==
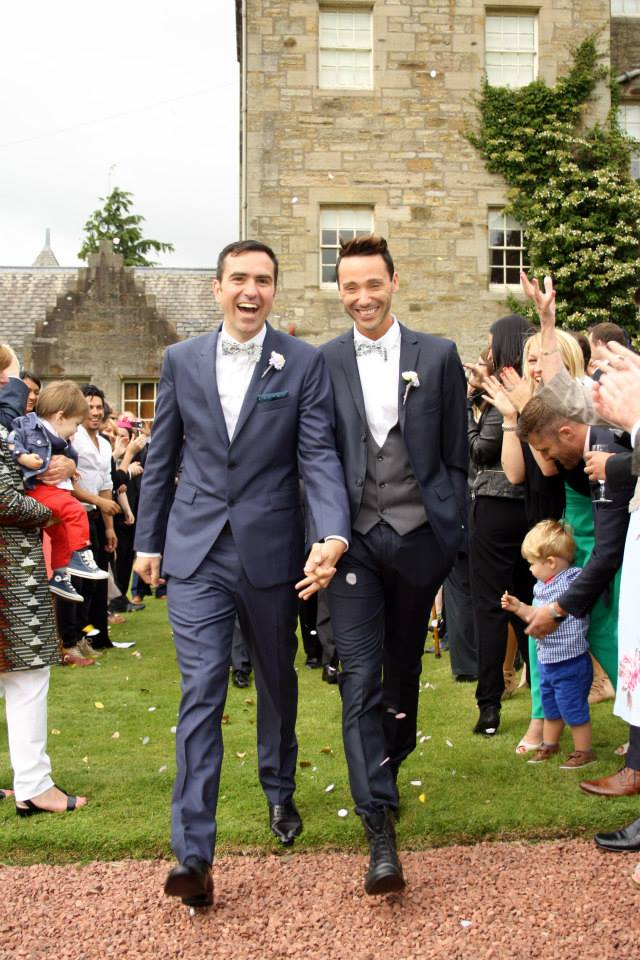
Gemmell and Stirk's wedding, 2015

Gemmell married Damien Lee Stirk, a ballet dancer and teacher, in 2015. His best man was Labour politician Conor McGinn, who mentioned his wedding in Parliament in support of marriage equality.

Gemmell was appointed OBE in the 2016 New Year Honours List. He is a Fellow of the Royal Society of Arts and a founding Leadership Fellow of St George's House, Windsor Castle.

Gemmell was included on the 2017 Financial Times list of Top 20 Public Sector LGBT Executives. He is listed in GQ Magazine's 2016 Most Connected Men in the UK. Gemmell was included in the 2018 Financial Times list of Top 30 Public Sector LGBT Executives.

In 2021, Gemmell was awarded an honorary doctorate by the University of Bolton for his contribution to UK-India trade relations. In November 2024 Gemmell received an honorary doctorate from the Kalinga Institute of Social Sciences, Bhubaneswar, Odisha in recognition of the investment and jobs created during his time as British Trade Commissioner and his work to strengthen UK-India relationship.

Gemmell lives in Irvine, a town in the constituency he represents.

Parliament of the United Kingdom
Preceded by Philippa Whitford	Member of Parliament for Central Ayrshire; 2024–present	Incumbent
