= List of early career awards =

This list of early career awards is an index to articles on notable awards given to individuals who show great promise early in their career.

== List of awards ==
=== Arts ===
Literary

- Geoffrey Faber Memorial Prize (recognises a single volume of poetry or fiction by a Commonwealth author under 40)
- International Young Publisher of the Year (young publishers)
- Bronwen Wallace Memorial Award (a writer under 35 who has not yet published his or her first book)

Music

- BBC Young Musician of the Year
- Eurovision Young Musicians
- International Young Music Entrepreneur of the Year (music industry)
- Peter Whittingham Award (musicians)

==== Theatre ====
- Barbara Whitman Award

Other

- Turner Prize (visual artist under age of 50)

=== Sciences ===
- Annie Jump Cannon Award in Astronomy (distinguished contributions by a woman within 5 years of receiving a PhD)
- Charles F. Lucks Award (for significant contribution to the subject of thermal conductivity by a young scientist)
- Fields Medal (mathematicians not over age of 40)
- Francqui Prize (Belgian scholar or scientist under 50)
- Margaret Oakley Dayhoff Award from the Biophysical Society, Rockfille, Maryland - given to a woman who "has achieved prominence for 'substantial contributions to science'" and showing high promise in the early part of her career
- Maria Goeppert-Mayer Award from the American Physical Society (outstanding work by a woman within 7 years of receiving a PhD)
- Otto Hahn Medal (young/junior scientists)
- Otto-Klung-Weberbank Prize (outstanding younger German scientists under the age of 40)
- Passano Foundation Young Scientist Award
- Searle Scholars Program (career development award made annually to the 15 young US professionals in biomedical research and chemistry)
- Phillip Law Postdoctoral Award for the Physical Sciences (early to mid-career scientists, within seven years of the awarding of their doctorate from a research institution in the State of Victoria, Australia)
- Frank Fenner's (prev. Science Minister's) Prize for Life Scientist of the Year (early to mid-career scientists, not more than ten years past the award of their highest degree (e.g. Master’s or PhD), working in the life sciences)
- Malcolm McIntosh Prize for Physical Scientist of the Year (early to mid-career scientists, not more than ten years past the award of their highest degree (e.g. Master’s or PhD), working in the physical sciences)
- Presidential Early Career Award for Scientists and Engineers
- Young Scientist Research Prizes (final year PhD candidates from a research institution in the State of Victoria, Australia)
- National Institutes of Health Genomic Innovator Award (early career investigators in genome biology and genomic medicine "with outstanding records of productivity as they pursue important research areas, including new directions as they arise")
- Young Environmentalist of the Year award (positive impacts in the water & environmental sector)

Social sciences

- T. S. Ashton Prize (economic history - author is 35 or younger, OR within 5 years of Ph.D., OR has no previous publication in economic/social history or closely related field)
- John Bates Clark Medal (American economist under age of 40)

== See also ==
- Lists of awards
- Lemelson–MIT Prize, for mid-career inventors
