= NLX-266 =

Clinical data
- Other names: NLX266
- Drug class: Serotonin 5-HT_{1A} receptor biased agonist
- ATC code: None

Identifiers
- IUPAC name: (3-chloro-4-fluorophenyl)-[4-fluoro-4-[[2-[(4-fluoro-2-pyridinyl)oxy]ethylamino]methyl]piperidin-1-yl]methanone
- CAS Number: 2170564-20-0
- PubChem CID: 132257041
- ChemSpider: 129067040
- ChEMBL: ChEMBL5868777

Chemical and physical data
- Formula: C_{20}H_{21}ClF_{3}N_{3}O_{2}
- Molar mass: 427.85 g·mol^{−1}
- 3D model (JSmol): Interactive image
- SMILES: C1CN(CCC1(CNCCOC2=NC=CC(=C2)F)F)C(=O)C3=CC(=C(C=C3)F)Cl
- InChI: InChI=1S/C20H21ClF3N3O2/c21-16-11-14(1-2-17(16)23)19(28)27-8-4-20(24,5-9-27)13-25-7-10-29-18-12-15(22)3-6-26-18/h1-3,6,11-12,25H,4-5,7-10,13H2; Key:VGNJZLFABGNCBA-UHFFFAOYSA-N

NLX-266 is a biased agonist of the serotonin 5-HT_{1A} receptor. It acts specifically as a very-high-affinity and selective ERK1/2-biased serotonin 5-HT_{1A} receptor agonist (K_{i} = 0.0447 nM; EC_{50} = 0.437 nM; E_{max} = 94%), with selectivity for ERK1/2 signaling over multiple other pathways. The drug produces antidepressant- and antiparkinsonian-like effects in rodents, with much greater efficacy than certain other serotonin 5-HT_{1A} receptor agonists like buspirone and gepirone. It shows favorable pharmacokinetics in rodents. The chemical synthesis of NLX-266 has been described. NLX-266 was developed by Neurolixis. It was first described in the scientific literature in 2025.

== See also ==
- NLX-101 (F-15599)
- Befiradol (NLX-112; F-13640)
- NLX-204
- TMU4142
