= NLX-204 =

Robust antidepressant

Clinical data
- Other names: NLX204
- Drug class: Serotonin 5-HT_{1A} receptor biased agonist

Identifiers
- IUPAC name: (3-Chloro-4-fluorophenyl)-[4-fluoro-4-[(2-pyridin-2-yloxyethylamino)methyl]piperidin-1-yl]methanone
- CAS Number: 2170405-10-2
- PubChem CID: 132256735
- ChemSpider: 88296509
- ChEMBL: ChEMBL4753328

Chemical and physical data
- Formula: C_{20}H_{22}ClF_{2}N_{3}O_{2}
- Molar mass: 409.86 g·mol^{−1}
- 3D model (JSmol): Interactive image
- SMILES: C1CN(CCC1(CNCCOC2=CC=CC=N2)F)C(=O)C3=CC(=C(C=C3)F)Cl
- InChI: InChI=1S/C20H22ClF2N3O2/c21-16-13-15(4-5-17(16)22)19(27)26-10-6-20(23,7-11-26)14-24-9-12-28-18-3-1-2-8-25-18/h1-5,8,13,24H,6-7,9-12,14H2; Key:ZMEGJWWPDKBOER-UHFFFAOYSA-N

NLX-204 is a drug that as of 2026 is being evaluated to treat depression. It is a selective biased agonist of the serotonin 5-HT1A receptor, distinguished by its preference for activating ERK1/ERK2 phosphorylation pathways.

This compound has demonstrated potent and rapid-acting antidepressant-like effects in preclinical models, with activity comparable to ketamine in reversing symptoms of depression and treatment-resistant depression in rodents. Recent studies suggest that NLX-204 also offers potential benefits reversing memory deficits and anxiety, positioning it as a candidate for a rapid-acting antidepressant therapy.

== Chemistry ==
=== Synthesis ===
NLX-204 is synthesized from 3-chloro-4-fluorobenzoic acid. Conversion to the corresponding benzoyl chloride followed by amidation with 4-piperidone yields a benzoylpiperidone intermediate. A Darzens reaction with chloroacetonitrile produces a cyanoepoxide, which undergoes regioselective ring opening with poly(hydrogen fluoride)pyridine to form a cyanohydrin. Final reductive amination with 2-(pyridin-2-yloxy)ethanamine in the presence of sodium cyanoborohydride affords NLX-204.

== See also ==
- F-15599 (NLX-101)
- Befiradol (F-13640; NLX-112)
- NLX-266
- TMU4142
