= Eptapirone =

Chemical compound

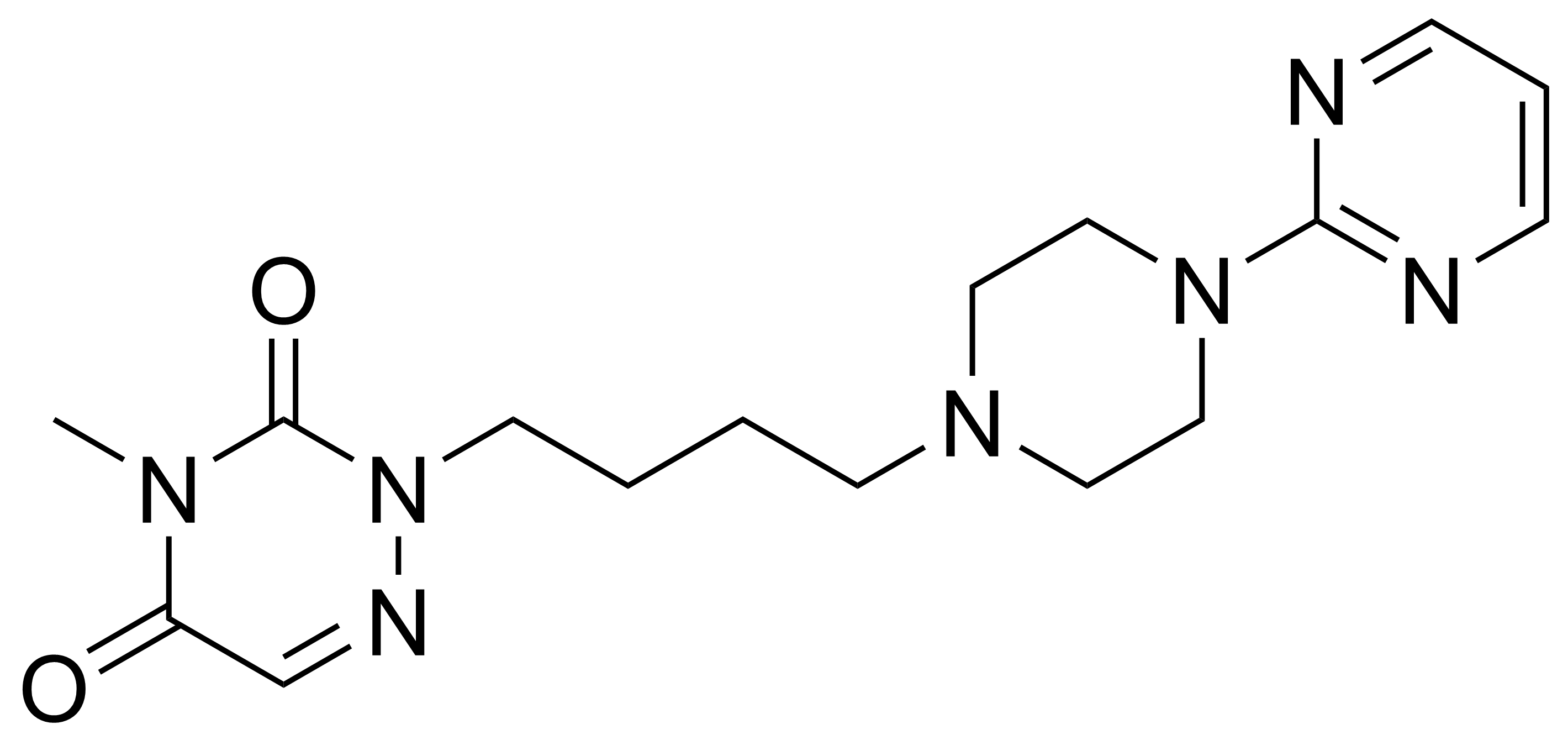

Clinical data
- Other names: F-11440; F11440; F-11,440
- Routes of administration: Oral
- Drug class: Serotonin 5-HT_{1A} receptor agonist
- ATC code: none

Legal status
- Legal status: In general: uncontrolled

Pharmacokinetic data
- Elimination half-life: 2 hours

Identifiers
- IUPAC name: 4-methyl-2-[4-(4-pyrimidin-2-ylpiperazin-1-yl)butyl]-1,2,4-triazine-3,5-dione
- CAS Number: 179756-85-5
- PubChem CID: 208928
- ChemSpider: 181024
- UNII: 3M824XRO8N
- CompTox Dashboard (EPA): DTXSID40170857

Chemical and physical data
- Formula: C_{16}H_{23}N_{7}O_{2}
- Molar mass: 345.407 g·mol^{−1}
- 3D model (JSmol): Interactive image
- SMILES: Cn1c(=O)cnn(c1=O)CCCCN2CCN(CC2)c3ncccn3
- InChI: InChI=1S/C16H23N7O2/c1-20-14(24)13-19-23(16(20)25)8-3-2-7-21-9-11-22(12-10-21)15-17-5-4-6-18-15/h4-6,13H,2-3,7-12H2,1H3; Key:NMYAHEULKSYAPP-UHFFFAOYSA-N

Eptapirone (developmental code name F-11440) is a very potent and highly selective 5-HT_{1A} receptor full agonist of the azapirone family. Its affinity for the 5-HT_{1A} receptor was reported to be 4.8 nM (K_{i}) (or 8.33 (pK_{i})), and its intrinsic activity approximately equal to that of serotonin (i.e., 100%).

Eptapirone and related high-efficacy 5-HT_{1A} full and super agonists such as befiradol and F-15,599 were developed under the hypothesis that the maximum exploitable therapeutic benefits of 5-HT_{1A} receptor agonists might not be able to be seen without the drugs employed possessing sufficiently high intrinsic activity at the receptor. As 5-HT_{1A} receptor agonism, based on animal and other research, looked extremely promising for the treatment of depression from a theoretical perspective, this idea was developed as a potential explanation for the relatively modest clinical effectiveness seen with already available 5-HT_{1A} receptor agonists like buspirone and tandospirone, which act merely as weak-to-moderate partial agonists of the receptor.

== Animal studies ==
In the Porsolt forced swimming test, eptapirone was found to suppress immobility more robustly than buspirone, ipsapirone, flesinoxan, paroxetine, and imipramine, which was suggestive of strong antidepressant-like effects. In this assay, unlike the other drugs screened, buspirone actually increased the immobility time with a single administration, while repeated administration decreased it, an effect that may have been related to buspirone's relatively weak intrinsic activity (~30%) at the 5-HT_{1A} receptor and/or it's preferential activation of 5-HT_{1A} somatodendritic autoreceptors over postsynaptic receptors.

After repeated administration, high dose paroxetine was able to rival the reduction in immobility seen with eptapirone. However, efficacy was seen on the first treatment with eptapirone, which suggested that eptapirone may have the potential for a more rapid onset of antidepressant effectiveness in comparison. Imipramine was unable to match the efficacy of eptapirone or high dose paroxetine, which was probably the result of the fact that higher doses were fatal.

In the conflict procedure, eptapirone produced substantial increases in punished responding without affecting unpunished responding, which was suggestive of marked anxiolytic-like effects. In addition, the efficacy of eptapirone in this assay was more evident than that of buspirone, ipsapirone, and flesinoxan.

== Human studies ==
Eptapirone has been assayed in humans in preclinical trials at an oral dose of 1.5 mg. In these studies, eptapirone reduced body temperature, prolonged REM sleep, increased cortisol and growth hormone levels, and produced side effects such as dizziness and drowsiness while being overall well tolerated. It peaked rapidly within 30–60 minutes and had an estimated half-life of two hours, with a total duration of approximately three hours.

== See also ==
- Befiradol
- F-15,599
