= International Young Design Entrepreneur of the Year =

British Council award

The International Young Design Entrepreneur of the Year (IYDEY) is a British Council award that is part of the International Young Creative Entrepreneur (IYCE) programme, which has been developed with 100% Design, a commercial interior design fair. It was established in 2005. It is targeted at designers aged 25 to 35. National winners are selected from countries, and brought to the United Kingdom for a tour of UK design industry, and to attend the 100% Design show.

== IYDEY 2005 ==
National winners include:

- Argentina: Hernán Braberman
- India: Neil Foley
- Lebanon: Raëd Abillama
- Lithuania: Beatrice Vanagaite
- Nigeria: Lanre Lawal
- Philippines: Jonathan Jay Aldeguer
- Poland: Ela Skrzypek
- Romania: Carla Szabo
- Slovenia: Nika Zupanc
- Thailand: Peerachat Prajeeyachat

The winner of the 2005 award is Lanre Lawal, a graphic designer and filmmaker from Nigeria.

== IYDEY 2006 ==
National winners include:

- Brazil: Paula Dib
- India: Ramesh Manickam
- Indonesia: M. Ridwan Kamil
- Lebanon: Maya Karanouh
- Slovenia: Gorazd Malačič
- South Africa: Heath Nash
- Thailand: Makorn Chaovanich
- Lithuania: Darius Cekanauskas

The winner of the 2006 award is Paula Dib, a Brazilian designer.

== IYDEY 2007 ==
National winners include:

- Argentina: Manu Rapoport
- China: Xu Ming
- Estonia: Markko Karu
- India: Gunjan Gupta
- Indonesia: Gustaff Harriman Iskandar
- Nigeria:Oluseyi Olubunmi Taylor
- Poland: Tomek Rygalik
- Slovenia: Martin Bricelj
- Thailand: Ruttikorn Vuttikorn
- Venezuela: Sigal Cohen

The winner of the 2007 award is Sigal Cohen from Venezuela.

== IYDEY 2008 ==
Finalists include:

- Egypt: Mohamed Fares Aly
- India: Siddhartha Das
- Lebanon: Nathalie Fallaha
- Malaysia: Ng Si Juan.
- Poland: Michał Kowalski
- South Africa: Jang Tsai
- Slovenia: Luka Stepan
- Taiwan: Nancy Chen
- Turkey: Osman Can Özcanlï

The winner of the 2008 award is Siddhartha Das.

== IYDEY 2009 ==
Finalists include:

- Indonesia: Johansen Samsoedin
- Slovenia: Anja Zorko
- South Africa: Given Nkuna
- Taiwan: I-Ming Shih
- Turkey: Pınar Yar Gövsa

The winner of the 2009 award is Rami Farook, from United Arab Emirates.

== See also ==
- International Young Publisher of the Year
- International Young Music Entrepreneur of the Year
