= FiveFilms4freedom =

LGBTQ online film festival

FiveFilmsForFreedom (previously FiveFilms4Freedom) is a free, online, 10-day LGBTQ+ film programme from the British Council and the British Film Institute originally supported by the UN Free & Equal campaign. It launched in 2015 as the first global, online LGBT film programme of its kind. The programme is a celebration of international LGBTQ+ short films selected from BFI Flare: London LGBTQ+ Film Festival, shared in a global campaign run by the British Council, which invites people all over the world to watch a movie and show that love is a human right. FiveFilms4Freedom was founded by Alan Gemmell and Briony Hanson, British Council Director of Film, in partnership with Tricia Tuttle, Artistic Director of BFI Festivals.

== FiveFilms4Freedom 2015 ==
FiveFilms4Freedom launched in 2015 and ran from 19–27 March. The festival screened five short films by American, British, Canadian and Danish Directors in 135 countries. A 24-hour social media campaign on Wednesday 25 March asked people to watch one of the festival films and show that love is a human right. The festival achieved a total social media reach of 75m.

=== 2015 Films ===
An Afternoon (En Eftermiddag) by Danish director Søren Green.

Chance by British director Jake Graf.

Code Academy by Canadian writer and director Nisha Ganatra.

Morning Is Broken by British director Simon Anderson.

True Wheel by American director Nora Mandray.

== FiveFilms4Freedom 2016 ==
FiveFilms4Freedom 2016 ran from 16–27 March with a 24-hour social media campaign day on Thursday 17 March. The festival screened five short films by Directors from Brazil, Spain, the Philippines, and the UK. FiveFilms4Freedom 2016 achieved a total digital reach of 140.5 million people with more than 1.5 million film views.

=== 2016 Films ===
SWIRL by Filipino director Petersen Vargas.

XAVIER by Brazilian director Ricky Mastro.

BREATHE by Irish director James Doherty.

TAKE YOUR PARTNERS by Scottish director Siri Rødnes.

THE ORCHID by Spanish director Ferran Navarro-Beltrán.

=== FiveFilms4Freedom 2016 Global List ===
On 17 March 2016 the British Council released a Global List of people promoting LGBTQ+ rights.

== FiveFilms4Freedom 2017 ==
FiveFilms4Freedom 2017 ran from 16–26 March with a 24-hour social media campaign day on Tuesday 21 March. The programme screened five short films by directors from the UK to mark the 50th anniversary of the UK's 1967 Sexual Offences Act, which partially decriminalised homosexuality. The films were viewed by over 1.7 million people in 202 countries including Afghanistan, China, Iraq, Russia, Uganda, and Yemen.

=== 2017 Films ===
Crush by director Rosie Westhoff.

Heavy Weight by director Jonny Ruff.

Jamie by director Christopher Manning.

Still Burning by director Nick Rowley.

Where We Are Now by director Lucie Rachel

== FiveFilms4Freedom 2018 ==
FiveFilms4Freedom 2018 ran from 23–31 March. The programme screened five short LGBTQ+ films online, selected from BFI Flare, made by directors from all over the world to support the message 'Love is a human right. It achieved views from 152 countries.

=== 2018 Films ===
Goddess by director Karishma Dev Dube.

Goldfish by director Yorgos Angelopoulos.

Handsome and Majestic by directors Jeff Lee Petry and Nathan Drillot.

Landline by director Matt Houghton.

Uninvited by director LSeung Yeob Lee

== FiveFilms4Freedom 2019 ==
FiveFilms4Freedom 2019 ran from 21–31 March. In 2019 the programme was linked as part of Anyone//Anywhere: the web at 30, the British Council's global season looking at the impact of this invention on every aspect of our lives. It achieved 3.8 million views.

=== 2019 Films ===
A Normal Girl (US) directed by Aubree Bernier-Clarke

Carlito se va para siempre/Carlito Leaves Forever (Peru/France) directed by Quentin Lazzarotto

Crashing Waves (UK) directed by Emma Jane Gilbertson

EG/I (Iceland) directed by Vala Ómarsdóttir and Hallfriður Thora Tryggvadottir

Ladies Day (UK) directed by Abena Taylor-Smith
