= Flesinoxan =

Chemical compound

Clinical data
- Other names: DU-29373; DU29373; DU-29,373
- Routes of administration: Oral
- Drug class: Serotonin 5-HT_{1A} receptor agonist
- ATC code: None

Legal status
- Legal status: In general: uncontrolled

Identifiers
- IUPAC name: 4-fluoro-N-(2-{4-[(2S)-2-(hydroxymethyl)-2,3-dihydro-1,4-benzodioxin-5-yl]piperazin-1-yl}ethyl)benzamide
- CAS Number: 98206-10-1
- PubChem CID: 57347
- IUPHAR/BPS: 1
- ChemSpider: 51700
- UNII: 3V574S89E1
- KEGG: D02568
- ChEMBL: ChEMBL1742477

Chemical and physical data
- Formula: C_{22}H_{26}FN_{3}O_{4}
- Molar mass: 415.465 g·mol^{−1}
- 3D model (JSmol): Interactive image
- SMILES: C1CN(CCN1CCNC(=O)C2=CC=C(C=C2)F)C3=C4C(=CC=C3)O[C@H](CO4)CO
- InChI: InChI=1S/C22H26FN3O4/c23-17-6-4-16(5-7-17)22(28)24-8-9-25-10-12-26(13-11-25)19-2-1-3-20-21(19)29-15-18(14-27)30-20/h1-7,18,27H,8-15H2,(H,24,28)/t18-/m0/s1; Key:NYSDRDDQELAVKP-SFHVURJKSA-N

Flesinoxan (developmental code name DU-29373) is a potent and selective 5-HT_{1A} receptor partial or near-full agonist of the phenylpiperazine class. Originally developed as a potential antihypertensive drug, flesinoxan was later found to possess antidepressant and anxiolytic effects in animal tests. As a result, it was investigated in several small human pilot studies for the treatment of major depressive disorder, and was found to have robust effectiveness and very good tolerability. It was also developed for treatment of anxiety disorders. The drug reached phase 3 clinical trials for anxiety disorders. However, due to "management decisions", the development of flesinoxan was stopped and it was not pursued any further. In humans, flesinoxan enhances REM sleep latency, decreases body temperature, and increases ACTH, cortisol, prolactin, and growth hormone secretion. In addition, both flesinoxan and LY-178210 induce anxiety in humans.

== See also ==
- 8-OH-DPAT
- Befiradol
- Buspirone
- Eptapirone
