= Befiradol =

Chemical compound

Clinical data
- ATC code: none

Legal status
- Legal status: In general: uncontrolled

Identifiers
- IUPAC name: 3-Chloro-4-fluorophenyl-[4-fluoro-4-([(5-methylpyridin-2-yl)methylamino]methyl)piperidin-1-yl]methanone
- CAS Number: 208110-64-9
- PubChem CID: 9865384
- IUPHAR/BPS: 3925
- ChemSpider: 8041076
- UNII: RAT9OHA1YH
- ChEMBL: ChEMBL45305
- CompTox Dashboard (EPA): DTXSID90943058

Chemical and physical data
- Formula: C_{20}H_{22}ClF_{2}N_{3}O
- Molar mass: 393.86 g·mol^{−1}
- 3D model (JSmol): Interactive image
- SMILES: Cc1ccc(nc1)CNCC2(CCN(CC2)C(=O)c3ccc(c(c3)Cl)F)F
- InChI: InChI=1S/C20H22ClF2N3O/c1-14-2-4-16(25-11-14)12-24-13-20(23)6-8-26(9-7-20)19(27)15-3-5-18(22)17(21)10-15/h2-5,10-11,24H,6-9,12-13H2,1H3; Key:PKZXLMVXBZICTF-UHFFFAOYSA-N

Befiradol (F-13,640; NLX-112) is an experimental drug being studied for the treatment of levodopa-induced dyskinesia. It is a potent and selective 5-HT_{1A} receptor full agonist.

== Pharmacology ==
In recombinant cell lines expressing human 5-HT_{1A} receptors, befiradol exhibits high agonist efficacy for a variety of signal transduction read-outs, including ERK phosphorylation, G-protein activation, receptor internalization and adenylyl cyclase inhibition. In rat hippocampal membranes it preferentially activates GalphaO proteins. In neurochemical experiments, befiradol activated 5-HT_{1A} autoreceptors in rat dorsal Raphe nucleus as well as 5-HT_{1A} heteroreceptors on pyramidal neurons in the frontal cortex. In rat models, it has powerful analgesic and antiallodynic effects comparable to those of high doses of opioid painkillers, but with fewer and less prominent side effects, as well as little or no development of tolerance with repeated use.

A structure–activity relationship (SAR) study revealed that replacement of the dihalophenyl moiety by 3-benzothienyl increases maximal efficacy from 84% to 124% (K_{i}=2.7 nM).

== History ==
Befiradol was discovered and developed by Pierre Fabre Médicament, a French pharmaceuticals company who initially developed it as a treatment for chronic pain. In September 2013, befiradol was out-licensed to Neurolixis, a US-based biotechnology company. Neurolixis announced that it intended to re-purpose befiradol for the treatment of levodopa-induced dyskinesia in Parkinson's disease. In support of this indication, Neurolixis received several research grants from the Michael J. Fox Foundation and preclinical data was published describing the activity of befiradol in animal models of Parkinson's disease. Studies published in 2020 using non-human primate models of Parkinson's disease, (MPTP-treated marmosets and MPTP-treated macaques), found that befiradol potently reduced Levodopa-induced dyskinesia at oral doses as low as 0.1 to 0.4 mg/kg. In January 2018, the British charity Parkinson's UK announced that it had awarded Neurolixis a grant to advance development of befiradol up to clinical phase in Parkinson's disease patients.

== Clinical Ph2A Trial for dyskinesia in Parkinson's disease ==
In March 2019, Neurolixis announced that the US Food and Drug Administration (FDA) gave a positive response to Neurolixis' Investigational New Drug (IND) application for NLX-112 to be tested in a Phase 2 clinical study in Parkinson's disease patients with troublesome levodopa-induced dyskinesia. On 22 November 2020, The Sunday Times reported that the two charities, Parkinson's UK and Michael J. Fox Foundation, were jointly investing $2 million to support a clinical trial on befiradol in Parkinson's disease patients with troublesome Levodopa-induced dyskinesia, a potentially "life changing" drug. On 23 November 2020, Parkinson's UK and Michael J. Fox Foundation, confirmed their funding in an official announcement. Neurolixis announced on 30 November 2021 the start of patient recruitment in the clinical trial. The trial is listed on the U.S. National Library of Medicine clinical trials register. On 20 March 2023, a joint press release from Neurolixis, Parkinson's UK and Michael J. Fox Foundation announced that the clinical trial had met its primary endpoint of safety and tolerability, and also the secondary endpoint of efficacy in reducing Levodopa-induced dyskinesia in the patients. Moreover, a later announcement (7 July 2023) disclosed that the clinical trial had also found that befiradol reduced parkinsonism symptoms (such as slowness of movement, tremor and rigidity), as well as Levodopa-induced dyskinesia, raising the prospect of developing a "dual-efficacy therapy" for Parkinson's disease.

== ^{18}F-Befiradol as an agonist PET radiotracer for brain imaging ==
As well as studies on befiradol for treatment of movement disorders, other researchers have investigated it as a novel radiotracer for brain imaging studies by positron emission tomography. Thus, befiradol labeled with [18F] (also known as 18F-F13640) has been used to study the distribution of serotonin 5-HT_{1A} receptors in rat, cat, macaque, and human. Because befiradol is an agonist, it enables the detection of 5-HT_{1A} receptors which are specifically in a functionally active state, whereas antagonist radiotracers label the total receptor population.

== See also ==
- Eptapirone
- Flesinoxan
- F-15,599
- Buspirone/zolmitriptan
