= Mesdopetam =

Chemical compound

Clinical data
- Other names: IRL-790; IRL790; IPN60170
- Drug class: Atypical dopamine D_{2} and D_{3} receptor antagonist

Pharmacokinetic data
- Elimination half-life: 7 hours

Identifiers
- IUPAC name: N-[2-(3-fluoro-5-methylsulfonylphenoxy)ethyl]propan-1-amine
- CAS Number: 1403894-72-3
- PubChem CID: 70980485
- DrugBank: DB16229
- ChemSpider: 81367293
- UNII: HD4QV8GX26
- ChEMBL: ChEMBL4594447

Chemical and physical data
- Formula: C_{12}H_{18}FNO_{3}S
- Molar mass: 275.34 g·mol^{−1}
- 3D model (JSmol): Interactive image
- SMILES: CCCNCCOC1=CC(=CC(=C1)S(=O)(=O)C)F
- InChI: InChI=1S/C12H18FNO3S/c1-3-4-14-5-6-17-11-7-10(13)8-12(9-11)18(2,15)16/h7-9,14H,3-6H2,1-2H3; Key:OSBPYFBXSLJHCR-UHFFFAOYSA-N

Mesdopetam (INN; developmental code names IRL-790, IPN60170) is a dopamine D_{2} and D_{3} receptor antagonist with preference for the D_{3} receptor which is under development for the treatment of Parkinson's disease, drug-induced dyskinesia, and psychotic disorders. It has been described by its developers as having "psychomotor stabilizing" properties.

== Pharmacology ==
The described intention behind mesdopetam was to develop a novel dopamine D_{2} and D_{3} receptor antagonist based on agonist- rather than antagonist-like structural motifs and with agonist-like physicochemical properties (e.g., smaller molecular size, greater hydrophilicity). It was hypothesized that this would result in an antagonist with specific dopamine receptor interactions more similar to those of agonists like dopamine but without any intrinsic activity, in turn resulting in different in vivo effects than conventional dopamine receptor antagonists. Specifically, antidyskinetic and antipsychotic effects with fewer or no motor side effects was sought. There is also extensive preclinical research to suggest that D_{3} receptor antagonists reduce levodopa-induced dyskinesia without compromising the antiparkinsonian effects of levodopa.

Mesdopetam has 6- to 8-fold preference for the dopamine D_{3} receptor (K_{i} = 90 nM) over the dopamine D_{2} receptor (K_{i} = 540–750 nM). It displays a paradoxical agonist-like binding mode in spite of its lack of activational efficacy. By antagonizing D_{3} autoreceptors, D_{3} receptor antagonists like mesdopetam have been found to disinhibit dopamine release in the prefrontal cortex, ventral tegmental area, and striatum, which might be involved in the possible therapeutic benefits of these agents. The drug is also a ligand of the sigma σ_{1} receptor (K_{i} = 870 nM) and has some affinity for certain serotonin receptors including the serotonin 5-HT_{1A} and 5-HT_{2A} receptors. In animals, mesdopetam has no effect on spontaneous locomotor activity at assessed doses but antagonizes levodopa-induced dyskinesia and reduces dextroamphetamine- and dizocilpine-induced locomotor hyperactivity.

== Side effects ==
Side effects of mesdopetam in clinical trials have been reported to include worsened parkinsonism, headache, fatigue, asthenia, and dissociation.

== Clinical development ==
Mesdopetam was first described in the literature in 2012. As of September 2024, it is in phase 2/3 clinical trials for Parkinson's disease, phase 1 trials for drug-induced dyskinesia, and is in preclinical development for psychotic disorders (specifically Parkinson's disease psychosis). It is also of interest for potential treatment of impulse control disorders. In 2019, mesdopetam received an INN with a novel -"dopetam" suffix supposedly representing a new mechanism of action among dopamine receptor modulators. In 2023, it was reported that mesdopetam failed to meet a primary anti-dyskinetic endpoint in a phase 2b trial. However, indications of efficacy were still seen and a phase 3 trial is being planned. No dopamine D_{3} receptor antagonists have yet completed development or been approved for the treatment of levodopa-induced dyskinesia.

== See also ==
- List of investigational antipsychotics
- List of investigational Parkinson's disease drugs
- Pirepemat (IRL752)
- Linepemat (possibly IRL757)
