= Nora Mandray =

French filmmaker

- Education: Sciences Po Paris; UCLA Film School
- Occupation: Filmmaker

Nora Mandray is a Berlin-based French filmmaker. Her works have notably screened at the Berlinale, Hot Docs, SXSW, Sheffield Doc/Fest, and the Camden International Film Festival.

== Career ==
Mandray is a Fulbright scholar, holding a double-Master's degree from Sciences Po Paris and UCLA Film School. Mandray has received grants from DAAD, the CNC, Scam*Brouillon d'un Rêve, as well as support from Berlinale Talents, the Mauriac Residency and the Maison Bleue.

Her debut work is a trilogy of short documentaries, all set in Detroit: 3 Acres in Detroit, 48217 Mesh and True Wheel follow Detroiters as they fight to turn their post-industrial city into a sustainable community. The films were selected as part of festivals and programs, such as Bruno Latour’s La Novela, the British Council fiveFilms4Freedom and PEN International/Outwrite. They were awarded with the 2014 Green Film Award at Innsbruck Nature Film Festival and the 2015 UK Green Film Festival Award for Best Short Documentary.

Her next project, Lucid Dream, screened at the 2015 SXSW Film Festival, the New York Film Festival and won the FIPA D'or at the Festival International de Programmes Audiovisuels. The film follows electronic musician Daedelus as he creates a new piece of music from sounds he discovers in Berlin. The film was aired on Arte France in 2015.

In 2017, Mandray embedded herself in the far-right party National Rally (ex-"Front National") in order to tell the story of the French presidential election; the resulting short documentary, Dancing With Le Pen, was produced by Laura Poitras and Charlotte Cook for The Intercept. It screened at Sheffield Doc/Fest, the London Short Film Festival and Dokufest.

Mandray's first feature documentary, The Process of Recovering (Nicht Meine Schande) was released on Vice Media in 2020. It follows an incest survivor on her recovery journey. The film was produced by Vice Media and Gebrueder Beetz, and aired on the German television network NDR as Nicht Meine Schande: Geschichte Eines Missbrauchs. The film had its US premiere at the Sarasota Film Festival and received praise from critics, including Der Spiegel, which wrote that it was, "highly ambitious... definitely worth watching."

Mandray's second feature documentary, Eli, A Dog in Prison, was released as a Topic Studios Original in 2021. Set in a prison outside Detroit, it follows three inmates who raise a puppy to become a guide dog for the blind. Common Sense Media wrote, "a beautiful, moving film about the humanity that can be brought out in all of us through our connection with animals."

Among her past and present collaborations, Mandray has assisted French directors Anne Feinsilber on Hard Times USA (Cinéma du Réel 2013) and Ruth Zylberman on The Dissidents, Les Artisans de la Liberté (étoile de la Scam 2011). Planningtorock contributed to the soundtrack of two of Mandray's films: True Wheel and Dancing With Le Pen.

In parallel to her film work, Mandray has created news and branded content, notably for ICRC and Tate Modern. That work has led her to follow Nobel Peace Prize nominee Alberto Cairo (physiotherapist) in Kabul, Afghanistan and UNDP Goodwill Ambassador Olafur Eliasson in Berlin.

Mandray has taught film at Met Film School.
