= TMU4142 =

Clinical data
- Other names: TMU-4142
- Drug class: Serotonin 5-HT_{1A} receptor biased agonist
- ATC code: None

Chemical and physical data
- Formula: C_{23}H_{30}N_{3}O_{4}
- Molar mass: 412.510 g·mol^{−1}
- 3D model (JSmol): Interactive image
- SMILES: O[C](CNCCCN1C(=O)CC2(CCCC2)CC1=O)COc3cccc4[nH]ccc34
- InChI: InChI=1S/C23H30N3O4/c27-17(16-30-20-6-3-5-19-18(20)7-11-25-19)15-24-10-4-12-26-21(28)13-23(14-22(26)29)8-1-2-9-23/h3,5-7,11,24-25,27H,1-2,4,8-10,12-16H2; Key:NJZRIWWCDITGNS-UHFFFAOYSA-N

TMU4142 is a potent and selective serotonin 5-HT_{1A} receptor biased agonist. It is a preferential near-full agonist of the G_{oA} pathway with weak agonism of the G_{i3} pathway and little or no β-arrestin2 recruitment.

Presynaptic serotonin 5-HT_{1A} autoreceptors predominantly signal via the G_{i3} pathway in the dorsal raphe nucleus (DRN) and are associated with feedback inhibition that may hamper therapeutic effects, whereas postsynaptic serotonin 5-HT_{1A} heteroreceptors couple mainly to G_{o} pathways in hippocampal and cortical areas and are thought to mediate antidepressant-like effects. As such, TMU4142 is a selective postsynaptic serotonin 5-HT_{1A} receptor agonist with the potential for greater antidepressant activity than other serotonin 5-HT_{1A} receptor agonists, such as 8-OH-DPAT, buspirone, gepirone, F-15599 (NLX-101), and vilazodone, among others. On the other hand, the G_{z} pathway is thought to be involved in anxiolytic-like effects. Analogously to TMU4142, pindolol is a moderate-efficacy partial agonist of the G_{o} pathways but a very weak partial agonist or antagonist of G_{i} pathways.

TMU4142 produces rapid antidepressant-like effects in rodents without modifying serotonin levels or neuronal firing rates in the DRN. This is in contrast to other serotonin 5-HT_{1A} receptor agonists like buspirone and F-13714, which are strong presynaptic serotonin 5-HT_{1A} receptor agonists and reduce DRN serotonin levels and neuronal firing rates. It is also in contrast to serotonin reuptake inhibitors like fluoxetine, which work by elevating serotonin levels, in turn activating both pre- and post-synaptic serotonin 5-HT_{1A} receptors, and which did not show rapid antidepressant-like effects in rodents.

TMU4142 was first described in the scientific literature by Chunyu Wang and colleagues in 2025. It is a combined derivative or analogue of pindolol and azapirones like buspirone with improved pharmacological properties such as selectivity, biased agonism, and activational efficacy.

== See also ==
- F-15,599 (NLX-101)
- NLX-204
- NLX-266
