= Paul Thompson (arts administrator) =

British arts administrator

Dr Paul Thompson CBE FRSA
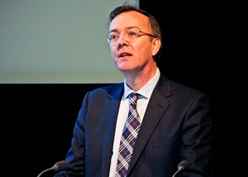

Chair of the British Council
- Incumbent
- Assumed office January 2024

Vice-Chancellor of the Royal College of Art
- In office September 2009 – April 2024
- Preceded by: Sir Christopher Frayling

Personal details
- Born: 9 August 1959 (age 67) Oxford, Oxfordshire, England, UK
- Education: University of Bristol; University of East Anglia

Paul Warwick Thompson CBE FRSA (born 9 August 1959) is the current Chair of the British Council. He was Vice-Chancellor of the Royal College of Art from 2009 to 2024.

Thompson was educated at Bryanston School, the University of Bristol (BA) and the University of East Anglia (MA, PhD).

Thompson worked as a scriptwriter and researcher for the Design Council 1987–88. He then joined the Design Museum as curator of contemporary design and from 1993 to 2001 was its director.

During 2001–09, Thompson was director of the Cooper Hewitt, Smithsonian Design Museum in New York City, USA. In 2009, he took up his post at the Royal College of Art. He was a trustee of the Victoria and Albert Museum, London, from 2009 to 2023, and was on the board of visitors of the Ashmolean Museum at the University of Oxford from 2013 to 2019. He was a member of the Board of Trustees of Universities UK from 2020 to 2023.

He is a member of the Wellcome Collection Programme Advisory Committee at the Wellcome Trust, London. He is an adjunct professor at Imperial College's Institute for Global Health Innovation. He co-directs the Helix Centre with Professor Lord Ara Darzi. Since 2020 he has been a member of the Board of Trustees, Creative UK.

He was appointed CBE in the 2024 Birthday Honours, for services to the Arts.
