= Linepemat =

Clinical data
- Other names: 3-(2,3-Difluorophenoxy)azetidine
- Routes of administration: Oral
- Drug class: Nootrope

Identifiers
- IUPAC name: 3-(2,3-difluorophenoxy)azetidine
- CAS Number: 1211876-03-7
- PubChem CID: 53407685
- ChemSpider: 26546723
- UNII: AES8RB3JS4
- ChEMBL: ChEMBL6047610

Chemical and physical data
- Formula: C_{9}H_{9}F_{2}NO
- Molar mass: 185.174 g·mol^{−1}
- 3D model (JSmol): Interactive image
- SMILES: C1C(CN1)OC2=C(C(=CC=C2)F)F
- InChI: InChI=1S/C9H9F2NO/c10-7-2-1-3-8(9(7)11)13-6-4-12-5-6/h1-3,6,12H,4-5H2; Key:TXTVXNRODZFMEX-UHFFFAOYSA-N

Linepemat (INN), also known as 3-(2,3-difluorophenoxy)azetidine, is a drug described as a "nootrope". It has been found to produce hyperlocomotion in rodents as well as to dose-dependently reverse the hypolocomotion induced by the monoamine depleting agent tetrabenazine in rodents. Linepemat is very similar in chemical structure to pirepemat (IRL752), another nootropic drug candidate.

The drug was patented by Integrative Research Laboratories (IRL) in January 2025 with the application of treatment of apathy and its INN was registered in January 2026. IRL is developing a drug with the developmental code name IRL757 for treatment of apathy in Parkinson's disease and neurodegenerative disorders.

== Status ==
As of January 2026, IRL757 is in phase 1/2 clinical trials for Parkinson's disease and phase 1 trials for neurodegenerative disorders, having entered phase 1/2 trials by December 2025.

== See also ==
- Motivation-enhancing drug
- Mesdopetam (IRL790)
