= Pirepemat =

Experimental cognitive enhancer

Clinical data
- Other names: IRL-752; IRL752

Pharmacokinetic data
- Elimination half-life: 3.7–5.2 hours

Identifiers
- IUPAC name: (3S)-3-(2,3-difluorophenyl)-3-methoxypyrrolidine
- CAS Number: 1227638-29-0
- PubChem CID: 135381565
- DrugBank: DB19165
- ChemSpider: 115009507
- UNII: JS88RK5NOI
- ChEMBL: ChEMBL5095193

Chemical and physical data
- Formula: C_{11}H_{13}F_{2}NO
- Molar mass: 213.228 g·mol^{−1}
- 3D model (JSmol): Interactive image
- SMILES: CO[C@@]1(CCNC1)C2=C(C(=CC=C2)F)F
- InChI: InChI=1S/C11H13F2NO/c1-15-11(5-6-14-7-11)8-3-2-4-9(12)10(8)13/h2-4,14H,5-7H2,1H3/t11-/m1/s1; Key:LJNFYMMXCXGFCP-LLVKDONJSA-N

Pirepemat (INN; developmental code name IRL752 or IRL-752) is a drug which is under development for the prevention of falls in people with Parkinson's disease and Parkinson's disease dementia. It has been referred to as a "nootrope" (i.e., nootropic or cognitive enhancer).

== Pharmacology ==
Pirepemat shows affinity for several neurotransmitter receptors and transporters. These include the serotonin 5-HT_{7} receptor (K_{i} = 980 nM), the sigma σ_{1} receptor (K_{i} = 1,200 nM), the serotonin transporter (SERT) (K_{i} = 2,500 nM), the α_{2C}-adrenergic receptor (K_{i} = 3,800 nM), the α_{2A}-adrenergic receptor (K_{i} = 6,500 nM), the serotonin 5-HT_{2C} receptor (K_{i} = 6,600 nM), the serotonin 5-HT_{2A} receptor (K_{i} = 8,100 nM), and the norepinephrine transporter (NET) (K_{i} = 8,100 nM). It also shows affinity for the rat κ-opioid receptor (KOR) (K_{i} = 6,500 nM) and has weak affinity for the α_{1}-adrenergic receptor (K_{i} = 21,000 nM). The drug was an antagonist or inhibitor at all assessed targets (which included some but not all of the preceding sites).

Pirepemat has been described as a "cortical enhancer" and has been reported to region-specifically increase norepinephrine, dopamine, and acetylcholine levels in the cerebral cortex. Serotonin 5-HT_{7} receptor antagonism and α_{2}-adrenergic receptor antagonism were hypothesized to underlie these effects. In animals, pirepemat has been found to reverse hypoactivity induced by the dopamine depleting agent tetrabenazine whilst not increasing basal locomotor activity and not affecting or minimally influencing dextroamphetamine- and dizocilpine-induced locomotor hyperactivity.

== Clinical trials ==
The drug was reported to improve motivation and reduce apathy in people with Parkinson's disease in a phase 2a clinical trial.

As of September 2024, pirepemat is in phase 2 clinical trials for Parkinson's disease. A phase 3 trial is being planned. The drug was also under development for the treatment of "behavioral disorders" and attention deficit hyperactivity disorder (ADHD). However, no recent development for the former indication has been reported and development for ADHD was discontinued. In August 2020, pirepemat received an INN with a novel suffix reflecting its reputedly new and unique mechanism of action. Pirepemat is under development by Integrative Research Laboratories (IRLAB).

== See also ==
- List of investigational Parkinson's disease drugs
- Motivation-enhancing drug
- Linepemat (possibly IRL757)
- Mesdopetam (IRL790)
