= F-15599 =

Chemical compound

Clinical data
- Other names: F-15599; F15599; NLX-101; NLX101
- Routes of administration: Oral
- Drug class: Serotonin 5-HT_{1A} receptor agonist

Legal status
- Legal status: Investigational

Pharmacokinetic data
- Metabolism: DB16936DB16936

Identifiers
- IUPAC name: 3-Chloro-4-fluorophenyl-[4-fluoro-4-[[(5-methylpyrimidin-2-ylmethyl)amino]methyl]piperidin-1-yl]methanone
- CAS Number: 635323-95-4
- PubChem CID: 11741361
- IUPHAR/BPS: 3924
- DrugBank: DB16936
- ChemSpider: 9916065
- UNII: 83481Y1YCX
- ChEMBL: ChEMBL230963
- CompTox Dashboard (EPA): DTXSID901029377

Chemical and physical data
- Formula: C_{19}H_{22}ClF_{2}N_{4}O
- Molar mass: 395.86 g·mol^{−1}
- 3D model (JSmol): Interactive image
- SMILES: Cc3cnc(nc3)CNCC(F)(CC2)CCN2C(=O)c(cc1Cl)ccc1F
- InChI: InChI=1S/C19H21ClF2N4O/c1-13-9-24-17(25-10-13)11-23-12-19(22)4-6-26(7-5-19)18(27)14-2-3-16(21)15(20)8-14/h2-3,8-10,23H,4-7,11-12H2,1H3; Key:WAAXKNFGOFTGLP-UHFFFAOYSA-N

F-15,599, also known as NLX-101, is a potent and selective 5-HT_{1A} receptor full agonist. In addition, it displays functional selectivity, or biased agonism, by preferentially activating postsynaptic serotonin 5-HT_{1A} receptors over somatodendritic serotonin 5-HT_{1A} autoreceptors. The drug has been investigated for potential use as a pharmaceutical drug in the treatment of conditions including depression, schizophrenia, cognitive disorders, Rett syndrome, and fragile X syndrome.

== Pharmacology ==
=== Pharmacodynamics ===
In terms of its functional selectivity, the drug preferentially activates and phosphorylates ERK1/2 over receptor internalization or inhibition of adenylyl cyclase. In addition, it preferentially activates the G_{αi} G protein subtype over the G_{αo} subtype. As a result of its biased agonism for postsynaptic 5-HT_{1A} receptors, F-15,599 shows regional selectivity in its central effects. It mainly activates the prefrontal cortex, cingulate cortex, retrosplenial cortex, septum, and the superior and inferior colliculi. Conversely, the drug does not significantly alter cerebral blood flow in areas characterized by abundance of presynaptic serotonin 5-HT_{1A} receptors, such as the raphe nucleus.

F-15,599 has shown antidepressant-like, anxiolytic-like, antidyskinetic, procognitive, and antiaggressive effects in animals. In cognitive tests in rodents, F-15,599 attenuates memory deficits elicited by the NMDA receptor antagonist phencyclidine (PCP), suggesting that it may improve cognitive function in disorders such as schizophrenia. Another study found that F-15,599 reduces breathing irregularity and apneas observed in mice with mutations of the MeCP2 gene, a mouse model of Rett syndrome.

== History ==
F-15,599 was first described in the scientific literature by 2006.

== Clinical trials ==
F-15,599 was discovered and initially developed by Pierre Fabre Médicament, a French pharmaceuticals company. In September 2013, F-15,599 was out-licensed to Neurolixis, a California-based biotechnology company. Neurolixis announced that it intends to re-purpose F-15,599 for the treatment of Rett syndrome. and obtained orphan drug designation from the United States Food and Drug Administration (FDA) and from the European Commission for this indication.

Researchers at the University of Bristol are investigating the activity of F-15599 in animal models of Rett Syndrome, with support from the International Rett Syndrome Foundation. In June 2015, the Rett Syndrome Research Trust awarded a grant to Neurolixis to advance F-15599 to clinical development.

As of September 2024, F-15,599 is in phase 1 clinical trials for fragile X syndrome. Conversely, no recent development has been reported for depressive disorders or Rett syndrome and development has been discontinued for cognition disorders, mood disorders, and schizophrenia.

== See also ==
- Befiradol (F-13640; NLX-112)
- Eptapirone (F-11440)
- NLX-266
- TMU4142
