= Scott McDonald (athletic director) =

Biographical details
- Education: University of Louisiana at Monroe

Playing career
- 1980–1983: Northeast Louisiana
- Position: Outfielder

Administrative career (AD unless noted)
- 2018: Louisiana–Monroe (CAO)
- 2018–2019: Louisiana–Monroe (interim AD)
- 2019–2022: Louisiana–Monroe

Scott McDonald is an American college athletics administrator. He was most recently the athletic director at the University of Louisiana at Monroe, a position he held from 2018 to 2022. He previously served as chief administrative officer and as interim athletic director at Louisiana–Monroe. McDonald played college baseball at Northeast Louisiana University from 1980 to 1983, where he led his team to the 1983 Southland Conference baseball tournament championship and a berth in the 1983 NCAA Division I baseball tournament. McDonald was named interim athletic director at the University of Louisiana at Monroe on September 4, 2018 before being named to the job on a permanent basis on June 12, 2019. McDonald resigned his position as athletic director at the University of Louisiana at Monroe on August 15, 2022.
