= British Council =

Organisation promoting cultural and linguistic knowledge of the United Kingdom

- Founded: 1934; 92 years ago
- Founder: British government
- Type: Cultural institution
- Headquarters: 1 Redman Place, Stratford, London E20 1JQ, England, United Kingdom
- Region served: Worldwide
- Product: British cultural and language education
- Key people: Paul Thompson (chair); Scott McDonald (chief executive)
- Revenue: £924,965,472 (2020–21)
- Expenses: £1,015,114,434 (2020–21)
- Website: www.britishcouncil.org

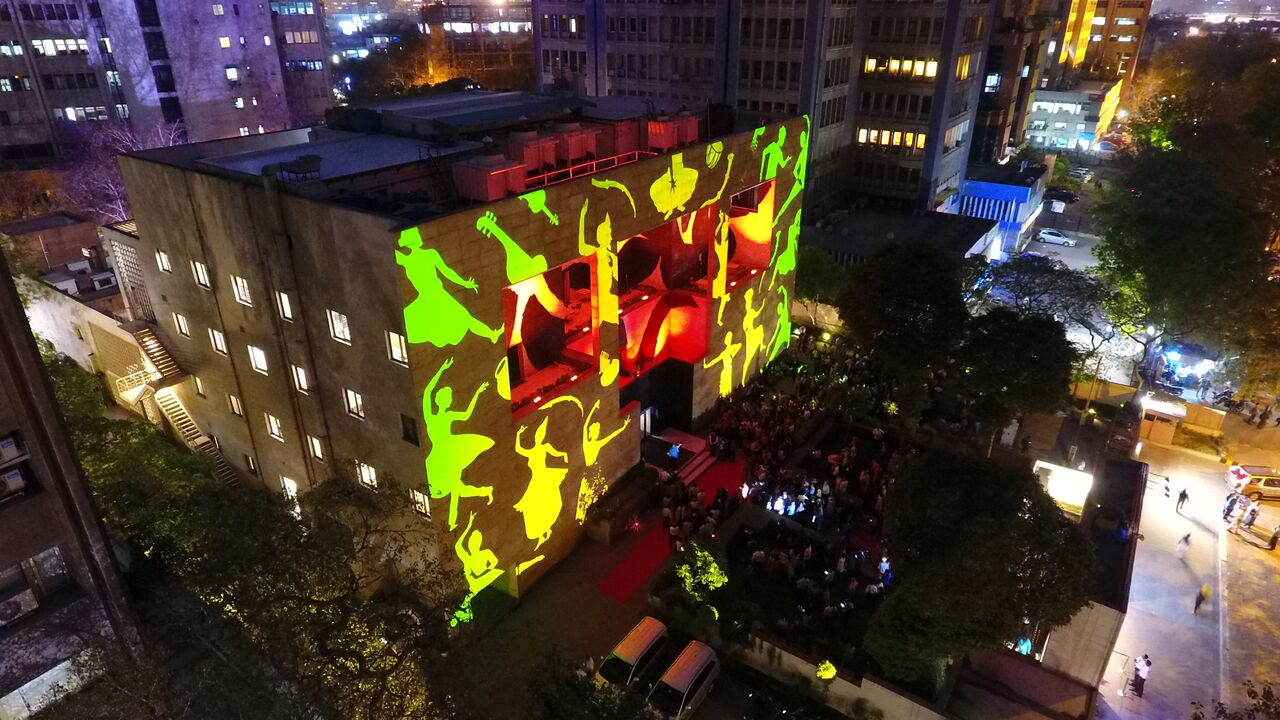
British Council Delhi launch of Mix The City Delhi, 6 April 2017

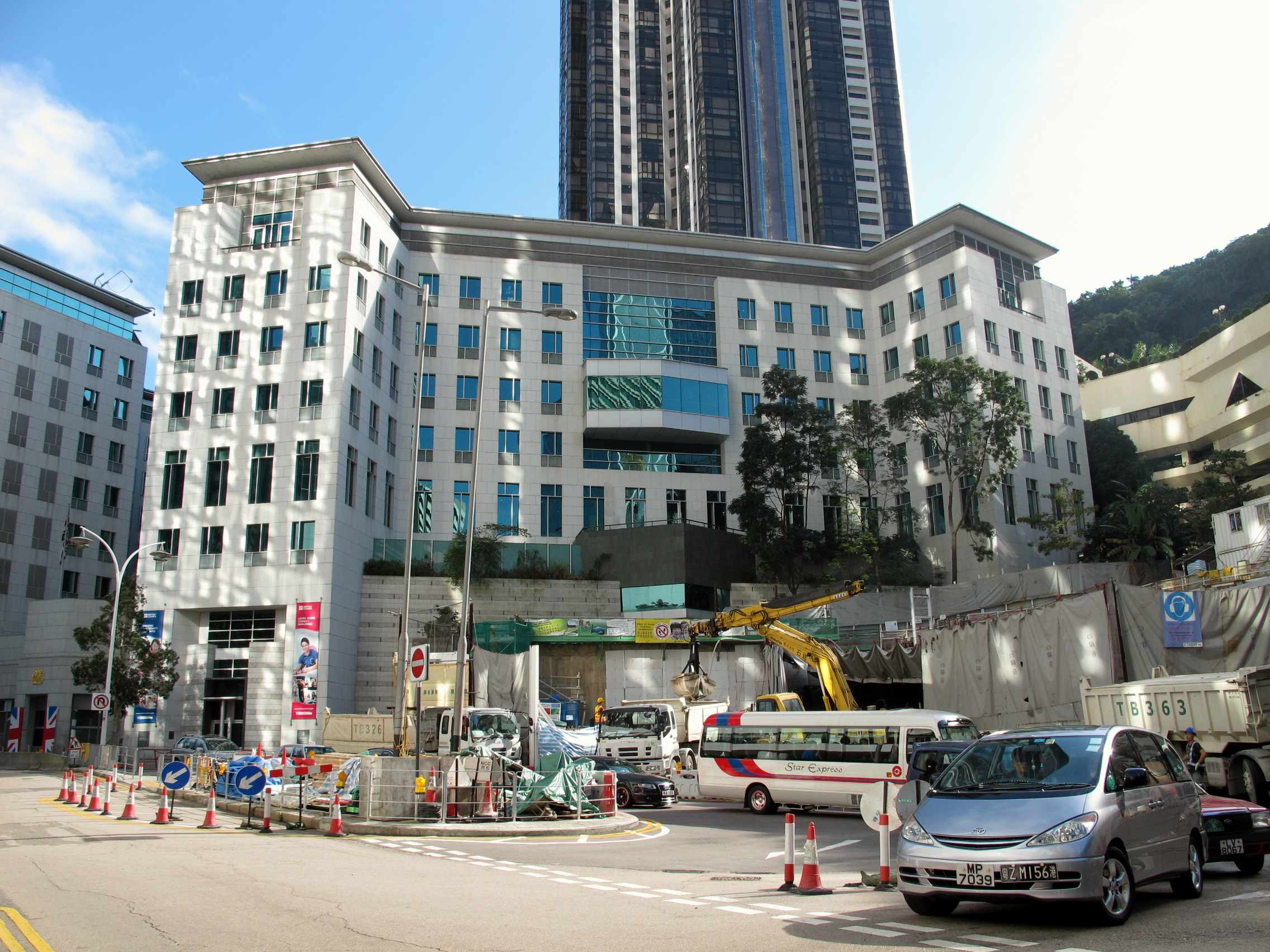
British Council building in Hong Kong

The British Council is a British organisation specialising in international cultural and educational opportunities. It works in over 100 countries promoting a wider knowledge of the United Kingdom and the English language (and the Welsh language in Argentina); encouraging cultural, scientific, technological and educational cooperation with the United Kingdom. The organisation has been called a soft power extension of UK foreign policy, as well as a tool for propaganda.

The British Council is governed by a royal charter. It is also a public corporation and an executive non-departmental public body, sponsored by the Foreign, Commonwealth and Development Office. Its headquarters are in Stratford, London. Its chair is Paul Thompson, and its chief executive is Scott McDonald.

== History ==
=== 1930s-70s ===
In 1934, the British Foreign Office officials created the "British Committee for Relations with Other Countries" to support English education abroad, promote British culture and fight the rise of the extreme ideologies of communism and fascism. The name quickly became the British Council for Relations with Other Countries. In 1936, the organisation's name was officially shortened to the British Council.

The British Council opened its first four offices in Bucharest (Romania), Cairo (Egypt), Lisbon (Portugal) and Warsaw (Poland) in 1938. The offices in Portugal are currently the oldest in continuous operation in the world. In 1940, King George VI granted the British Council a Royal Charter for promoting "a wider knowledge of [the United Kingdom] and the English language abroad and developing closer cultural relations between [the UK] and other countries".

The British Council undertook a promotion of British culture overseas in 1942. The music section of the project was a recording of significant recent compositions by British composers: E. J. Moeran's Symphony in G minor was the first work to be recorded under this initiative, followed by recordings of Walton's Belshazzar's Feast, Bliss's Piano Concerto, Bax's Third Symphony, and Elgar's The Dream of Gerontius. It also established the British Book Export Scheme in collaboration with commercial publishers.

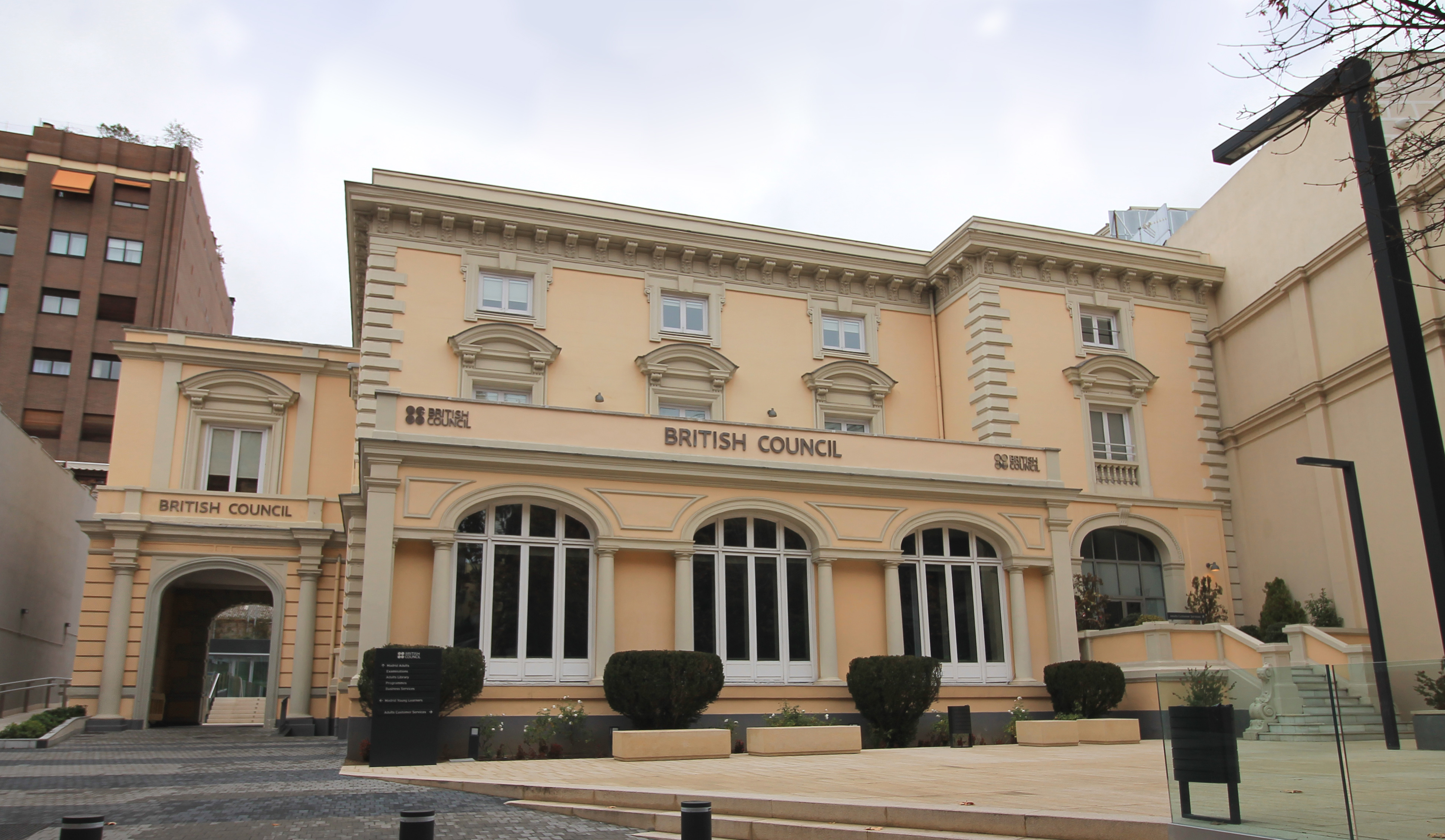
British Council building in Madrid, Spain

In August 1944, after the liberation of Paris, Austin Gill was sent by the British Council to reestablish the Paris office, which soon had tours by the Old Vic company, Julian Huxley and T. S. Eliot.

In 1946, the British Council collected handicraft products from crafts that were being practiced in the British countryside for an "Exhibition of Rural Handicrafts from Great Britain" that travelled to Australia and New Zealand. The majority of the collection was sold to the Museum of English Rural Life in 1960 and 1961.

In 1948, the British Council sponsored a tour by the Old Vic Theatre Company to Australia and New Zealand. The cast was led by Laurence Olivier and Vivien Leigh, performing a repertoire of three plays: Richard III, The School for Scandal, and Skin of Our Teeth. In Australia, the company gave 179 performances and were seen by over 300,000 people. The tour made a profit of about £40,000.

In 1969, the Technical College of the Federal University of Minas Gerais (Coltec) was established in Belo Horizonte through an agreement between the British Council, the Federal University of Minas Gerais (UFMG), the National Council for Scientific and Technological Development (CNPq), and the Brazilian Ministry of Education (MEC). The book collection at the Coltec library began in 1970 with a donation of more than three hundred books from the British Council.

=== 21st century ===
The Russian Foreign Ministry ordered the British Council to close its offices outside Moscow in 2007. The Ministry alleged that it had violated Russian tax regulations, a move that British officials claimed was retaliation over the British expulsion of Russian diplomats allegedly involved with the poisoning of Alexander Litvinenko. This caused the British Council to cease carrying out all English-language examinations in Russia in January 2008. That month it was accused of being a front-organization for the British intelligence arm MI-6 by the FSB, in which allegations would resurface in June 2025. In 2008, its head in St. Petersburg, Stephen Kinnock, was arrested. In early 2009, a Russian arbitration court ruled that the majority of the tax claims, valued at $6.6 million, were unjustified.

In June 2025, Russia designated the British Council as an “undesirable organisation,” resulting in the suspension of its remaining activities in the country, and limiting access for Russian students and educators to English-language examinations, academic resources, and cultural exchange programmes. Following the designation, Russia’s Federal Security Service (FSB) stated that it had identified and 'warned' university teaching staff in four regions who had cooperated with the British Council. The decision restricts Russian citizens’ access to IELTS certification, which is a common requirement for emigration, study, and employment in numerous countries. Russia also cited the British Council’s alleged support for the 'LGBT movement', which had been officially banned in Russia under legislation designating it as 'extremist'.

=== Attacks ===
In 1984, Kenneth Whitty, Deputy Director of the British Council in Athens, was murdered by militants from the Abu Nidal Organisation.

On 19 August 2011 a group of armed men attacked the British Council office in Kabul, the capital of Afghanistan, killing at least 12 people – none of them British – and temporarily took over the compound. All the attackers were killed in counter-attacks by forces guarding the compound. The British Council office was relocated to the British Embassy compound, as the British Council compound was destroyed in the suicide attack.

In 2013, the British Council in Tripoli, Libya was targeted by a car bomb on the morning of 23 April. Diplomatic sources were reported as saying that "the bombers were foiled as they were preparing to park a rigged vehicle in front of the compound gate". The attempted attack was simultaneous with the attack on the French Embassy in Tripoli on the same day that injured two French security guards, one severely, and wounded several residents in neighbouring houses. A jihadist group calling itself the Mujahedeen Brigade was suspected, possibly linked to Al-Qaeda in the Islamic Maghreb.

On 28 August 2025, the British Council building in the Ukrainian capital of Kyiv was damaged in a Russian missile strike, with one security guard injured. The Russian Ambassador to the UK, Andrey Kelin, was summoned to the Foreign Office by Foreign Secretary David Lammy.

== Organisation ==
The British Council is a charity governed by royal charter. It is also a public corporation and an executive non-departmental public body, sponsored by the Foreign, Commonwealth and Development Office. Its headquarters are in Stratford, London. Its chair is Paul Thompson, and its CEO is Scott McDonald.

The British Council's total income in 2014–2015 was £973 million principally made up of £154.9 million grant-in-aid received from the Foreign and Commonwealth Office; £637 million income from fees and teaching and examinations services; and £164 million from contracts.

The British Council works in more than 100 countries: promoting a wider knowledge of the UK and the English language; encouraging cultural, scientific, technological and educational understanding and cooperation; changing people's lives through access to UK education, skills, qualifications, culture and society; and attracting people who matter to the future of the UK and engaging them with the UK's culture, educational opportunities and its diverse, modern, open society.

In 2014–2015, the British Council spent: £489 million developing a wider knowledge of the English language; £238 million encouraging educational cooperation and promoting the advancement of education; £155 million building capacity for social change; £80 million encouraging cultural, scientific and technological cooperation; and £10 million on governance, tax and trading expenses.

During the COVID-19 pandemic the British Council took a £200 million rolling emergency loan from the government at commercial interest rates, requiring annual renewal. In 2025, this loan was seen as risk to the financial stability of the council.

== Notable activities ==
=== English and examinations ===
The British Council offers face-to-face teaching in more than 80 teaching centres in more than 50 countries. Three million candidates took UK examinations with the British Council in more than 850 towns and cities in 2014–2015.

The British Council helps run the global IELTS English test.

The British Council jointly runs the global IELTS English-language standardised test with Cambridge University Press and Assessment and IDP Education Australia. Over 2.5 million IELTS tests were delivered in 2014–2015.

==== Massive Open Online Course (MOOC) ====
In 2014, the British Council launched its first MOOC, Exploring English: Language and Culture, on the UK social learning platform FutureLearn. This was accessed by over 230,000 people.

==== English for peace ====
"Peacekeeping English" is a collaboration between the British Council, the Foreign, Commonwealth and Development Office and the Ministry of Defence to improve the English-language skills of military personnel through the Peacekeeping English Project (PEP). PEP is helping train approximately 50,000 military and police service personnel in 28 countries, amongst them Libya, Ethiopia and Georgia.

=== Mobility programmes ===
==== Education UK ====
In 2013, the British Council relaunched the global website Education UK for international students interested in UK education. The site receives 2.2 million visitors per year and includes a search tool for UK courses and scholarships, advice and articles about living and studying in the UK.

==== Erasmus+ ====
From 2014 to 2020, the British Council and Ecorys UK jointly administered almost €1 billion of the €14.7 billion Erasmus+ programme offering education, training, youth and sports opportunity for young people in the UK. It was expected that nearly 250,000 people will have undertaken activities abroad with the programme.

=== Schools ===
==== Connecting Classrooms ====
Over 16,000 schools have taken part in an international school partnership or benefited from teacher training through the British Council Connecting Classrooms programmes.

=== Universities ===
==== RENKEI network ====
The RENKEI network, established in 2012, brings together universities from Japan and the UK. RENKEI stands for "Research and Education Network for Knowledge Economy Initiatives" in English and means "collaboration" in Japanese. As of May 2024, the members are the universities of Durham, Edinburgh, Leeds, Liverpool, Newcastle and Southampton from the UK and Keio, Kyushu, Ritsumeikan and Tohoku universities from Japan.

=== Arts and culture ===
==== ACCELERATE ====
ACCELERATE was a leadership programme for Aboriginal and Torres Strait Islander people in the creative arts, run jointly by the British Council and the Australia Council in partnership with Australian state arts agencies, between 2009 and 2016. During that time, 35 people participated in the programme, with many alumni going on to excel in their fields.

==== UK-India Year of Culture ====
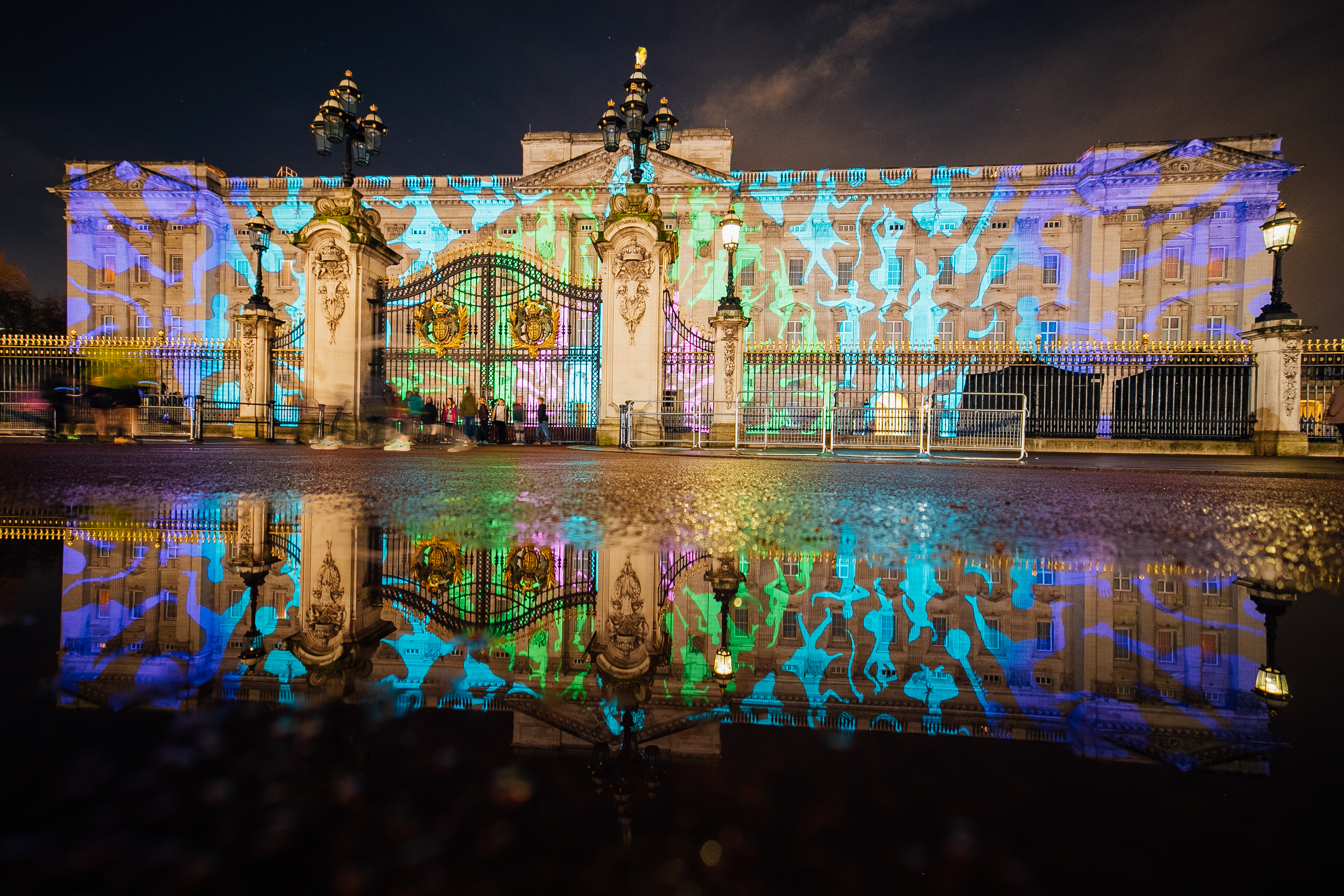
UK-India Year of Culture official launch image on the façade of Buckingham Palace

Her Majesty Queen Elizabeth II hosted the official launch of the UK-India Year of Culture on 27 February 2017 at Buckingham Palace, with Indian Finance Minister Arun Jaitley representing Prime Minister Narendra Modi. The British Council worked with the Palace and British-Indian start-up Studio Carrom to project a peacock, India's national bird, onto the facade of Buckingham Palace.

==== fiveFilms4freedom ====
In 2015, the British Council launched fiveFilms4freedom, a free, online, 10-day LGBT film festival with the British Film Institute, supported by the UN Free & Equal campaign. It was the first global online LGBT film festival. The festival runs a 24-hour campaign to ask people to watch a movie and show that love is a human right. In 2016, films were viewed by over 1.5m people in 179 countries.

==== Shakespeare Lives ====
In October 2015, the British Council announced Shakespeare Lives, a global programme, with the BBC, British Film Institute, the National Theatre, the Royal Shakespeare Company, the Shakespeare 400 consortium, the Shakespeare Birthplace Trust and Shakespeare's Globe to celebrate Shakespeare's life and work on the 400th anniversary of this death.

==== Selector Radio ====
Selector Radio is a weekly two-hour radio show, produced by Audio Always for the British Council. Originally launched in 2001, the show is now broadcast in more than 30 countries around the world, connecting a global audience to a wide range of music the United Kingdom has to offer, covering a variety of genres from grime, indie, soul, dance and more. The show features interviews, guest DJ mixes and exclusive live sessions from some of the UK's most exciting artists. It avoids many mainstream acts, in favour of emerging talent and underground styles. It has an estimated listenership of over four million people. The show is currently hosted in the UK by Sian Eleri since 2024 - previous hosts include Jamz Supernova, Goldierocks and Andrea Oliver – and many countries take the English language version of the show and create a new show from the tracks and features, translating the 'links' into the local language.

=== Cultural and educational exchange with North Korea ===
The British Council has been running a teacher training programme in North Korea since 2001. In July 2014 the British Council signed a Memorandum of Understanding with the Democratic People's Republic of Korea (DPRK) for cultural and educational exchange.

=== Young Creative Entrepreneur Awards ===
The British Council's Young Creative Entrepreneurs Awards identify and support talented people from across the creative industries, such as the International Young Publisher of the Year, International Young Design Entrepreneur of the Year, International Young Music Entrepreneur of the Year and British Council West Africa Arts Programme ~ Creative Entrepreneurs 2018 awards.

== Controversies ==
=== British Council and the Indian diaspora effect ===
The British Council has faced criticism for outsourcing key functions, including teacher recruitment, to a shared services centre in Noida, India. Concerns have been raised over the influence of the Indian diaspora in shaping policy, with key figures such as Sanjay Patel (Chief People Officer), Vijay Doshi (Chief Financial Officer, formerly held by Bidesh Sarkar), and Sushil Saluja (Trustee, Chair of the Commercial Committee) in senior roles.

Critics question whether this 'living bridge' has led to political blind spots on human rights, as outsourcing continues despite India's documented rights abuses under the BJP. The decision to outsource coincides with MPs Virendra Sharma and Navendu Mishra holding vice-chair roles in both the British Council and India Trade APPGs, raising transparency concerns. Moreover, the issue gained further prominence when Rishi Sunak visited the British Council's New Delhi centre in 2023; just two years after the British Council had sold its IELTS business in India.

Critics warn that growing reliance on Indian corporate partnerships, such as Tata's takeover of British Council services, risks prioritising cost-cutting over human rights and British cultural diplomacy.

=== British Council's handling of Afghan teachers post-2021 ===
The British Council faced criticism for leaving behind over 100 Afghan teachers during the Taliban's 2021 takeover, exposing them to persecution for promoting UK values. While most were relocated to the UK by 2024 after years of hardship, some remain in danger, underscoring a critical failure in duty of care and the urgent need for systemic reform.

=== Expenses ===
In 2010, Conservative MP Mark Lancaster, the then Lord Commissioner of HM Treasury, the then Speaker of the House of Commons Michael Martin, and other MPs were involved in rows over expenses incurred on undisclosed taxpayer-funded British Council trips. The British Council's then chief executive, Martin Davidson, also faced press criticism for expenses claimed in an apparent breach of the British Council's internal rules for overnight stays in London.

=== Closure in Russia ===
In 2007, the Russian government accused the British Council of an illegal operation by breaking Russian tax laws and ordered the organisation to close two of its offices. Many believed that the council had become the victim of a diplomatic row between the UK and Russia. In 2018, Russia expelled 23 British diplomats and closed down the British Council (due to a lack of regulations on its activities) along with the general consulate in St. Petersburg. The move was reported to be retaliation against the UK's actions toward Russia for the poisoning of Sergei and Yulia Skripal.

=== Israel and Palestine ===
The British Council has been a primary partner of the Palestine Festival of Literature since the Festival's beginning in 2008. In 2009, the Israeli police, acting on a court order, closed down the venue scheduled to host the Festival's closing event since there was Palestinian Authority involvement, but the British Council stepped in and the evening was relocated to its grounds.

The British Council supports the festival, also known as PalFest. A controversial issue arose in 2012 because PalFest's website states that they endorse the "2004 Palestinian call for the academic and cultural boycott of Israel". Susanna Nicklin, the council's director of literature, said in response: "The British Council is a non-political organisation, and we believe that international cultural exchange makes a powerful contribution to a more peaceful, tolerant and prosperous world. Therefore, the British Council does not support cultural or academic boycotts."

=== Closure in Syria ===
The British Council closed its operations in Syria in 2012 due to the Syrian civil war. The closure was a result of the deteriorating security situation and the inability to ensure the safety of its staff and visitors.

=== Dissident Chinese writers ===
In April 2012, the British Council faced a storm of protests over the exclusion of dissident Chinese writers from the London Book Fair 2012. Critics included English PEN and journalist Nick Cohen writing for The Observer, as well as Alastair Niven, a former Literature Director of the British Council itself.

=== Cuts ===
In March 2007, the British Council announced its "intention to increase its investment in the Middle East, North Africa and Central and Southern Asia". In June 2007, MPs were told of further closures in Tel Aviv and East Jerusalem (where there had been a British Council Library since 1946). The British Council libraries in Athens and Belgrade were also scheduled to close. Similarly in India, the British Council libraries at Bhopal and Thiruvananthapuram were closed despite protests from library users as part of the Council's policy to "reduce its physical presence" in the country and to divert funds to mega projects in the fields of culture, education, science and research.

British Council libraries and offices have also been closed in several other countries judged by the British Council to be of little strategic or commercial importance, as it refocused its activities on China and the Persian Gulf area. Council offices were closed in Lesotho, Eswatini, Ecuador and provincial Länder in Germany in 2000–2001 – as well as Belarus – prompting Parliamentary criticism. Subsequent promises by British Council Chair Neil Kinnock to a conference in Edinburgh that the Belarus closure would hopefully prove to be just a "temporary" withdrawal proved illusory. The British Council office in Peru also closed in September 2006 as part of a rethink of its strategy in Latin America. In Italy, British Council closed its offices in Turin and Bologna and reduced the size of offices in Milan and Rome (with the closure of the library in the latter).

Charles Arnold-Baker, author of the Companion to British History said of the British Council's shift in priorities: "This whole policy is misconstrued from top to bottom. We are going somewhere where we can't succeed and neglecting our friends in Europe who wish us well. The only people who are going to read our books in Beirut or Baghdad are converts already."

The article also points out that the Alliance française and the Goethe-Institut, unlike the British Council, are both expanding and replenishing libraries Europe-wide. France opened its new library in Tel Aviv in 2007, just a few months after the British Council closed there and shut down the British Council library in West Jerusalem. In Gaza, the Institut français supports the Gaza municipal library in partnership with the local authority and a municipal twinning link between Gaza City and the French port of Dunkirk. In Oslo, British Council informs Norwegian callers that "our office is not open to the public and we do not have an enquiry service". Goethe Institute also has a more visible presence in Glasgow than the British Council. There is now, in contrast, only one British Council office left in Germany – and that is in Berlin.

=== Accountability ===
Formally, it is to its sponsoring department, the Foreign, Commonwealth and Development Office, that parliamentary questions regarding the British Council are referred to.

The effectiveness of British Council efforts to promote higher education in China was examined in the UK by the House of Commons Select Committee on Education and Skills in a report issued in August 2007. It expressed concern that in terms of joint educational programmes involving Chinese universities, the UK lagged Australia, the US, Hong Kong, Canada and France. In its evidence to this committee, the British Council argued that "UK degrees are highly valued by international students for their global recognition. International students adopt an essentially utilitarian view of higher education which is likely to increasingly involve consideration of value for money, including opting for programmes at least partly delivered offshore". As their preferred marketing "model", the British Council gave the example of India where their UK India Education and Research Initiative is being "championed" by British multinational oil companies such as BP and Shell, the pharmaceutical giant GSK and arms company BAE Systems.

Criticism of British Council marketing efforts in this area has also come from Scotland where The Sunday Herald obtained documents under the Freedom of Information Act showing that the British Council's Marketing Co-ordinator in the US had been referring to the University of Stirling as "The University of Sterling" (sic) and also documenting "tensions" between Scottish Executive civil servants and British Council in India and China over overseas promotion of universities in Scotland where education is a devolved responsibility. The Sunday Herald reported that these turf wars were undermining the Scottish Executive's key Fresh Talent policy.

Some of the activities of the British Council were examined in 2007/2008 by the National Audit Office (NAO). The NAO's report, The British Council: Achieving Impact, concluded: "that the British Council's performance is strong and valued by its customers and stakeholders". It also concluded, however, that its English classes are elitist and have unfair advantages over commercial providers, as well as questioning thousands of unanswered phone calls and e-mails to British Council offices.

As part of its examination of the Foreign, Commonwealth and Development Office Annual Report, the Foreign Affairs Committee spends an hour each year examining witnesses from the British Council but even this level of scrutiny is undermined by a Commons ruling exempting MPs from the requirement to declare overseas trips paid for by The British Council.

Two members of the Public Accounts Committee (Nigel Griffiths MP and Ian Davidson MP) were office-bearers in the British Council Associate Parliamentary Group. Nigel Griffiths MP was Vice-Chair of this British Council lobby group until stepping down as an MP.

In 2008, the British Council was called before the Public Accounts Committee (PAC) following the earlier publication of a National Audit Office report. The subsequent PAC report confirmed that Nigel Griffiths MP – Vice Chair of The British Council Associate Parliamentary Group – was part of the small number of PAC members who approved this report on the British Council despite not having been recorded as being present during the evidence session – in June 2008 – where the British Council's chief executive was cross-examined. Mr Griffiths had earlier travelled to Russia and spoke favourably of British Council activities there in January 1998 around the time that their man in St Petersburg (Stephen Kinnock) was expelled.

In April 2008, the British Council was told to ensure all portable media was encrypted after losing staff data and wrongly saying the disc was encrypted.

Following the accusations made against the British Council in Russia (see above) Trevor Royle, diplomatic editor of The Sunday Herald, quoted a "British diplomatic source" saying: "There is a widespread assumption that The British Council is a wing of our Secret Intelligence Services, however minor. Officially it is no such thing but there are connections. Why should it be otherwise because all information is invaluable? After all, the British Council also deals with trade missions and inevitably that involves low-grade intelligence-gathering."

In 2005, along with the Alliance française, the Dante Alighieri Society, the Goethe-Institut, the Instituto Cervantes, and the Instituto Camões, the British Council shared in the Princess of Asturias Award for the outstanding achievements of Western Europe's national cultural agencies in communications and the humanities. At the time of this joint award, the full extent of The British Council's closure policies in Europe was not yet public knowledge.

=== In literature ===
Royle also goes on to note that the novel The Russia House by John Le Carré (former consular official David Cornwell) opens with a reference to The British Council. The organisation's "first-ever audio fair for the teaching of the English language and the spread of British culture" is "grinding to its excruciating end" and one of its officials is packing away his stuff when he is approached by an attractive Russian woman to undertake clandestine delivery of a manuscript which she claims is a novel to an English publisher who she says is "her friend"!

It is also featured in one of the scenes in Graham Greene's The Third Man – the character Crabbin, played by Wilfrid Hyde-White in the film, worked for The British Council. In 1946, the writer George Orwell advised serious authors not to work for it as a day job arguing that "the effort [of writing] is too much to make if one has already squandered one's energies on semi-creative work such as teaching, broadcasting or composing propaganda for bodies such as the British Council". In her autobiography, Dame Stella Rimington, the first woman head of MI5, mentions working for British Council in India before joining the British Intelligence Services.

The British Council was referred to (and its man on-station, Goole) – frequently in a humorous way by Lawrence Durrell in his collection of anecdotes about a diplomat's life on foreign postings for the Foreign Office – Antrobus Complete.

In the six Olivia Manning novels that make up The Balkan Trilogy and The Levant Trilogy, Guy Pringle is an employee of the British Council, and Council politics make up several of the plot points. The books portray Eastern Europe and the Middle East in the opening years of World War Two.

=== Burma ===
The role of the British Council in Myanmar in 1947 came under scrutiny with the release of classified documents to a BBC investigation by journalist Feargal Keane into the role of dissident British colonial officials in the assassination of the then Burmese independence leader Aung San (father of Aung San Suu Kyi). The BBC programme quoted from a 1948 document sent by the Chief of Police in Rangoon to the British Ambassador stating their belief that there had been British involvement in the assassination of Aung San and his Cabinet for which one of his political opponents was hanged and that "the go-between" had been a British Council official named in the programme.

=== Libya ===
In August 2011, a journalist from The Irish Times discovered a certificate dated 2007 issued by the British Council in Tripoli to a daughter of President Gaddafi who had previously been said to have been killed in a US raid on Gaddafi's residence in 1986.

=== English and examinations ===
In July 2011, the Hong Kong edition of China Daily reported on the flourishing "ghost-writing" industry that critics suggest has sprung up around the British Council IELTS tests in China.

A major IELTS corruption scandal in Western Australia resulted in prosecutions in November 2011.

=== Connecting Classrooms ===
In January 2012, the press in Pakistan reported that the Federal Investigations Agency was investigating a visa scam associated with the British Council's Connecting Classrooms programme.

== Chairs ==
The Council has been chaired by:

- 1934–37 Lord Tyrrell
- 1937 Lord Percy
- 1937–41 Lord Lloyd
- 1941–45 Sir Malcolm Robertson
- 1946–55 Sir Ronald Adam
- 1955–59 Sir David Kelly
- 1959–67 Lord Bridges
- 1968–71 Lord Fulton
- 1971–72 Sir Leslie Rowan
- 1972–76 Lord Ballantrae
- 1977–84 Sir Charles Troughton
- 1985–92 Sir David Orr
- 1992–98 Sir Martin Jacomb
- 1998–2004 Baroness Kennedy of The Shaws
- 2004–09 Lord Kinnock
- 2010–16 Sir Vernon Ellis
- 2016–19 Christopher Rodrigues
- 2019–23 Stevie Spring
- 2024–present Paul Thompson

== Trade unions ==
Some staff at the British Council are members of unions. UK staff are represented by the Public and Commercial Services Union. Some employees in Japan belong to the General Union.

== Publications ==
Media in Education and Development
- Language: English

Publication details
- History: 1967–1989
- Frequency: Quarterly

Standard abbreviations
- ISO 4: Media Educ. Dev.

Indexing
- ISSN: 0262-0251
- OCLC no.: 8210712

Links
- Journal homepage

From 1967 to 1989, the British Council published the journal Media in Education and Development.

=== History ===
Initially titled CETO news, ISSN 0574-9409, it became Educational Television International: a journal of the Centre for Educational Television Overseas, ISSN 0424-6128, in March 1967 (volume 1, issue 1). The journal changed its name again, in March 1971, to Educational Broadcasting International: a journal of the Centre for Educational Development Overseas, ISSN 0013-1970 (volume 5, issue 1). Its final name change was to Media in Education and Development, ISSN 0262-0251, in December 1981 (volume 14 issue 4). The final issue went to print in 1989 (volume 22).

=== British Council Partnership ===
- English UK

=== List of British Council approved centres ===
- British Study Centres

== Annex ==
=== Locations ===
The British Council is organised into seven regions.

==== Americas ====
The British Council has offices in:

- Argentina
- Brazil
- Canada
- Chile
- Colombia
- Cuba
- Jamaica
- Mexico
- Peru
- Trinidad and Tobago
- United States
- Venezuela

==== East Asia-Pacific ====
The British Council has offices in:

- Australia
- Brunei
- Cambodia
- China
- Hong Kong
- Indonesia
- Japan
- South Korea
- Malaysia
- Myanmar
- New Zealand
- Philippines
- Singapore
- Taiwan
- Thailand
- Vietnam

==== Europe ====
The British Council has offices in:

- Albania
- Austria
- Belgium
- Bosnia and Herzegovina
- Bulgaria
- Croatia
- Cyprus
- Czech Republic
- Estonia
- France
- Germany
- Greece
- Hungary
- Ireland
- Italy
- Latvia
- Lithuania
- Malta
- Montenegro
- Netherlands
- North Macedonia
- Norway
- Poland
- Portugal
- Romania
- Serbia
- Slovenia
- Slovakia
- Spain
- Switzerland
- Ukraine
- United Kingdom

==== West Asia and North Africa ====
The British Council has offices in:

- Armenia
- Azerbaijan
- Egypt
- Algeria
- Bahrain
- Georgia
- Iraq
- Jordan
- Kuwait
- Lebanon
- Libya
- Kazakhstan
- Morocco
- Oman
- Palestine
- Qatar
- Saudi Arabia
- Syria
- Tunisia
- Turkey
- United Arab Emirates
- Uzbekistan
- Yemen

==== South Asia ====
The British Council has offices in:

- Bangladesh
- India
- Nepal
- Pakistan
- Sri Lanka

==== Sub-Saharan Africa ====
The British Council has offices in:

- Botswana
- Cameroon
- Eritrea
- Ethiopia
- Ghana
- Kenya
- Malawi
- Mauritius
- Mozambique
- Namibia
- Nigeria
- Senegal
- Sierra Leone
- South Africa
- South Sudan
- Sudan
- Tanzania
- Zambia
- Zimbabwe
- Rwanda
- Uganda

== See also ==
- Eunic
- Teaching English as a second or foreign language (TEFL)
- Cultural diplomacy
- Public diplomacy
- Goethe-Institut
