= Scott McDonald (CEO) =

- Born: 1967 (age 58–59)
- Education: McGill University; Cambridge University
- Occupation: Management Consultant
- Employer: Oliver Wyman
- Title: President & CEO

Scott McDonald (born 1967) is Chief Executive of the British Council (appointed September 2021). Prior to joining the British Council, he was president and chief executive officer of Oliver Wyman – the management consulting business of Oliver Wyman Group. McDonald graduated from the Canadian McGill University Desautels Faculty of Management, where he received degrees in Finance & Economics, and from Cambridge University in England, where he received a Master of Philosophy degree in International Relations.

== Career ==
Scott McDonald was born in Toronto, Canada. In the late 1970s, Scott's family moved to Saudi Arabia. His father (a doctor) and mother (a teacher and nurse) were involved in the early days of both the King Faisal Specialist Hospital in Riyadh and the Sultan Qaboos University in Muscat, after which they moved to Dubai. McDonald said, "We lived right near Jumeirah Beach but there was no hotel, no developments or anything, and our small compound was about the only thing that existed.

After studying at McGill University and Cambridge University, McDonald joined Oliver Wyman in 1995 in London. In 2005, McDonald was appointed the leader of the Corporate and Institutional Banking practice, and in 2007, was named managing partner. In 2012, McDonald was named president of Oliver Wyman.

In 2013, McDonald was promoted by Marsh & McLennan Companies to CEO of Oliver Wyman Group, a subsidiary that includes design consulting firm Lippincott and NERA Economic Consulting

Scott is a member of the International Advisory Board of the Desautels Faculty of Management of McGill University and a member of McGill's expert panel on Strategy & Leadership. He is also a Trustee of Working Families UK, a Corporate Advisory Board member of Teach First and an Honorary Board member of the Mandiri Research Institute. Scott has been a speaker at events held by the Council of Foreign Relations in New York, the World Knowledge Forum in Seoul, and at Oliver Wyman's annual World Economic Forum lunch in Davos.

Business positions
Preceded by John Drzik	Former Chief Executive Officer, Oliver Wyman; 2012–2021	Succeeded by Nick Studer
Preceded by Sir Ciarán Devane	Chief Executive, British Council; 2021–Present	Succeeded by -
