= Conflict procedure =

Scientific quantification of anxiety

The conflict procedure is an experiment often used in scientific research to quantify anxiety levels by measuring changes in punished/unpunished responses. It is often used to screen drugs for their potential to inhibit anxiety (anxiolytic potential).

== Study ==
Some researchers from France have conducted an experiment on "Effects of Chronic Antidepressants in an Operant Conflict Procedure of Anxiety in the rat (1998)", "the aim of their study was to reveal possible anxiolytic like effects of antidepressants during ongoing treatment. Rats were subjected to a conflict procedure during which lever pressing for food was suppressed by a conditioned signal for punishment and contingent electric foot shocks." In the preparatory phase of the experiment, researchers increased anxiety using electrical shocks on rats gradually over a several week long training process. They then administered the chosen drug and observed how it altered the responses of the rats.

Other studies have used conflict procedures to test a variety of drugs, and some have reported that depressants cause an increase in punished responses, while anxiolytic drugs decrease the level of punished responding.

== See also ==
- Forced swim test
