= International Young Music Entrepreneur of the Year =

The International Young Music Entrepreneur of the Year award is a British Council and London Calling award program for young (aged 25 to 35) entrepreneurs in the music industry from the developing and transitional economies, launched in 2006, and last held in 2009.

The program participants come from all sectors of the music industry - label managers, artist managers, DJs/VJs, festival directors, music retailers, and others. Chosen by an international jury and following a visit to London, Manchester and the Glastonbury festival, the winner receives a financial award of £7,500 to be spent on a collaborative project with the British Council.

== IYMEY 2006 ==
The first winner of the IYMEY award was Mohamed 'Momo' Merhari from Morocco, who co-founded the Boulevard des Jeunes Musiciens, the largest contemporary music festival in North Africa and the first event dedicated to urban, contemporary and underground music. Momo was joined by specially commended finalists from India and Indonesia as well as finalists from Argentina, Estonia, Kenya, Lebanon, Poland and Venezuela.

== IYMEY 2007 ==
Finalists for the 2007 edition of the IYMEY award came from Egypt, India, Indonesia, Latvia, Lithuania, Malaysia, Nigeria, Philippines, Poland and Tanzania, and Audu Maikori who runs Chocolate City, a label, studio and event consultancy in Nigeria was chosen as the winner.

== IYMEY 2008 ==
Finalists for the 2008 edition of the IYMEY award came from Colombia, Estonia, India, Jordan, Kenya, Argentina/Venezuela, Lithuania, Malaysia, Nigeria, and Poland. Robert Simenya also known as Robert Kamanzi or simply Rkay from East Africa [Kenya] was chosen as the winner in 2008 for kenya. He runs Moja Entertainment Ltd., which includes artist management, music publishing and distribution, Music video production, a record label, and a recording studio. He is also a board member and the Chairman of the Performers Rights Society of Kenya (PRISK] from 2010 - 2016.

== See also ==
- International Young Publisher of the Year
