= Levodopa-induced dyskinesia =

Movement disorder

- Specialty: Neurology

Levodopa-induced dyskinesia (LID) is a form of dyskinesia associated with levodopa (L-DOPA), used to treat Parkinson's disease. It often involves hyperkinetic movements, including chorea, dystonia, and athetosis.

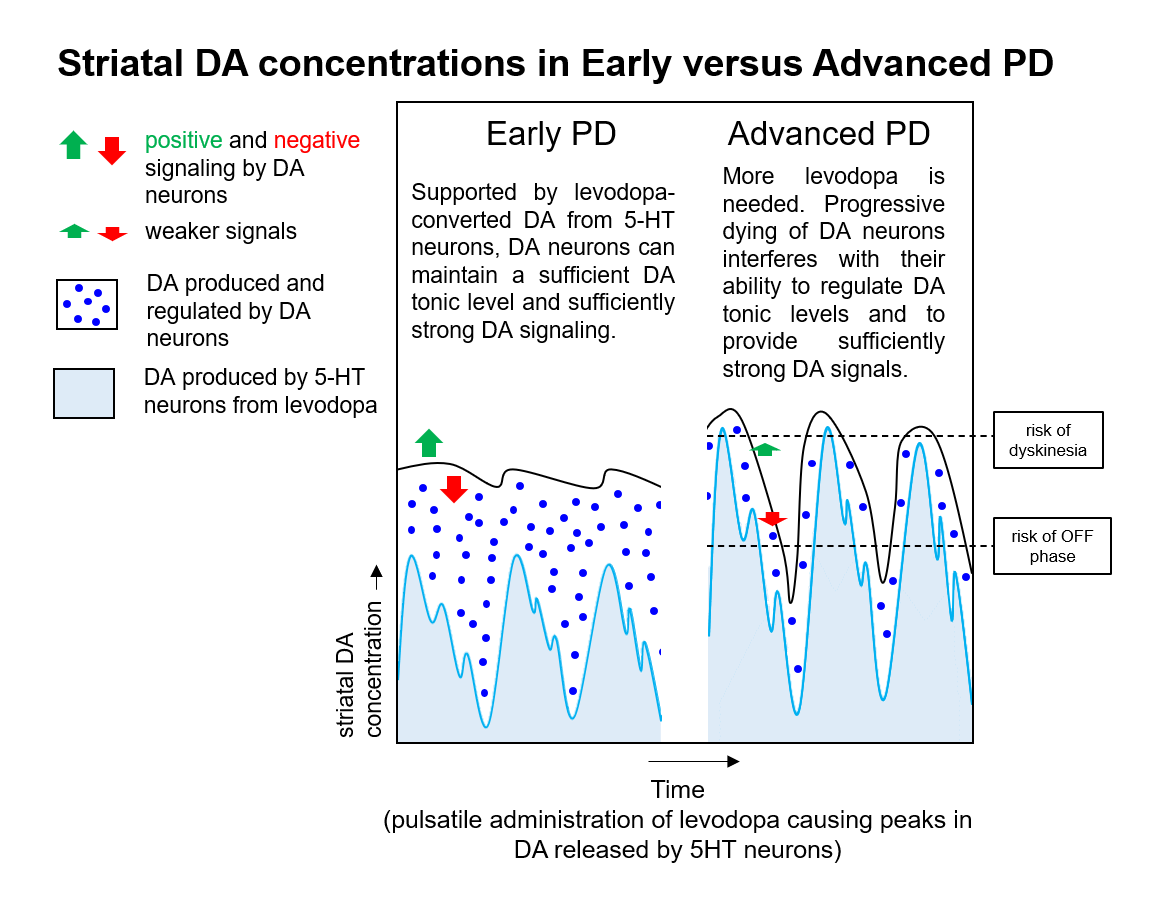
Figure 1. Figure based, with permission, on Figure 2 in open access article DOI: 10.1007/s00702-025-02893-4. Risks of LID and OFF-phase after levodopa treatment increase in late PD. In early PD, in the striatum, if supported by some extra dopamine (DA) production from serotonergic (5HT) neurons that convert exogenous levodopa to DA as a false neurotransmitter, the remaining DA neurons are still sufficient to homogenize extracellular DA concentrations (they have a “buffering capacity”) and provide natural DA signals. In late PD, however, when the DA neurons diminish, more levodopa needs to be given so the 5HT neurons can produce more DA. Because these 5HT neurons do not reuptake DA or have any other DA-specific regulatory function, the wave of highs and lows in striatal DA concentrations starts to more exactly follow the timings of levodopa administration. These increased fluctuations increase the risk of LID and OFF-phase.

In the context of Parkinson's disease (PD), dyskinesia is often the result of long-term dopamine therapy. These motor fluctuations occur in up to 80% of PD patients after 5–10 years of L-DOPA treatment, with the percentage of affected patients increasing over time. Based on the relationship with levodopa dosing, dyskinesia most commonly occurs at the time of peak L-DOPA plasma concentrations and is thus referred to as peak-dose dyskinesia (PDD). As patients advance, they may present with symptoms of diphasic dyskinesia (DD), which occurs when the drug concentration rises or falls. If dyskinesia becomes too severe or impairs the patient's quality of life, a reduction in L-DOPA might be necessary, however this may be accompanied by a worsening of motor performance. Therefore, once established, LID is difficult to treat. Amongst pharmacological treatments, NMDA receptor antagonist, amantadine, has been proven to be clinically effective in a small number of placebo controlled randomized controlled trials, while many others have only shown promise in animal models. Attempts to moderate dyskinesia by the use of other treatments such as bromocriptine (Parlodel), a dopamine agonist, appears to be ineffective. In order to avoid dyskinesia, patients with the young-onset form of the disease or young-onset Parkinson's disease (YOPD) are often hesitant to commence L-DOPA therapy until absolutely necessary for fear of suffering severe dyskinesia later on. Alternatives include the use of dopamine agonists (e.g., ropinirole or pramipexole) in lieu of early L-DOPA treatment which delays the use of L-DOPA. Additionally, a review shows that highly soluble L-DOPA prodrugs may be effective in avoiding the in vivo blood concentration swings that potentially lead to motor fluctuations and dyskinesia.

== Mechanism ==
Levodopa-induced dyskinesia has long been thought to arise through pathological alterations in pre-synaptic and post-synaptic signal transduction in the nigrostriatal pathway (dorsal striatum). However, a more straightforward explanation is that in progressed Parkinson's disease—with continued degeneration of dopaminergic neurons—the bulk of levodopa-derived dopamine release in the striatum is performed by serotonergic neurons that have no negative feedback mechanisms (they lack D2R receptors and dopamine transporter molecules); therefore, striatal dopamine peaks more extremely follow the bolus levodopa administration pattern (Figure 1).

It is thought that the stage of illness, dosage of L-DOPA, frequency of L-DOPA treatment and the youth of the patient at the onset of symptoms contribute to the severity of the involuntary movements associated with LID.

In experiments employing real-time electrophysiological recordings in awake and active animals, LIDs have been shown to be strongly associated with cortical gamma-oscillations with accompanying Δc-fos overexpression, proposedly due to a dysregulation of dopamine signaling in the cortico-basal ganglia circuitry. This was concluded partially from reduced tyrosine hydroxylase (TH) staining in the cortex – and the fact that a dopamine D_{1} receptor antagonist, delivered exclusively to the cortex, relieved the dyskinesia at its peak-time.

ΔFosB overexpression in the dorsal striatum (nigrostriatal dopamine pathway) via viral vectors generates levodopa-induced dyskinesia in animal models of Parkinson's disease. Dorsal striatal ΔFosB is overexpressed in rodents and primates with dyskinesias; moreover, postmortem studies of individuals with Parkinson's disease that were treated with levodopa have also observed similar dorsal striatal ΔFosB overexpression.

== Treatment ==
Levetiracetam, an antiepileptic drug which has been demonstrated to reduce the severity of levodopa-induced dyskinesias, has been shown to dose-dependently decrease the induction of dorsal striatal ΔFosB expression in rats when co-administered with levodopa. Although the signal transduction mechanism involved in this effect is unknown.

Nicotine (administered by dermal adhesive patches) has also been shown to improve levodopa-induced dyskinesia and other PD symptoms.

Patients with prominent dyskinesia resulting from high doses of antiparkinsonian medications may benefit from deep brain stimulation (DBS), which may benefit the patient in two ways: 1) DBS theoretically allows a reduction in L-DOPA dosage of 50–60% (tackling the underlying cause); 2) DBS treatment itself (in the subthalamic nucleus or globus pallidus) has been shown to reduce dyskinesia.

In 2017, the US Food and Drug Administration (FDA) approved the first treatment for levodopa-induced dyskinesia for Parkinson's patients: Gocovri (amantadine), manufactured by Adamas Pharmaceuticals. Mavoglurant and ketamine are also currently studied for the treatment of this disease.

Mesdopetam is under development for the treatment of levodopa-induced dyskinesia.
