= International Young Publisher of the Year =

Literary award programme, developed by the British Council and the London Book Fair

The International Young Publisher of the Year is a British Council award programme, which has been developed with the support of the London Book Fair. It is targeted at publishers aged 25 to 35 from emerging economies. The winner receives a free exhibition stand at the next London Book Fair and a financial award. The winner then goes on to develop a publishing project between the UK and their country.

The final of the international competition with eight to ten participants is held every year to coincide with the London Book Fair. Finalists are selected in national competitions organised locally by the British Council's overseas offices.

The finalists take part in an industry tour, which familiarises them with the dynamics of the UK publishing sector and introduces them to leading players in the industry. The finalists develop a network between themselves and with their peers in the UK sector. The finalists are also asked to select works from their country, which they then present at a book pitch to an expert jury and the general public.

All the finalists have now formed an alumni network which pioneers the importance of business networking internationally for young entrepreneurs in the publishing business.

In 2007, the award was renamed International Young Publishing Entrepreneur, as part of a rebranding which coincided with the launch of the final awards in the programme. The British Council's Young Creative Entrepreneur programme now has nine international awards: communications, design, fashion, interactive, music, performing arts, publishing, screen and visual arts.

== IYPY 2004 ==
Among finalists from Argentina, Colombia, India, Lithuania, Mexico, Nigeria, the Philippines and Poland, the inaugural IYPY finalists went on a tour of the UK publishing industry to London, Cambridge, Tiptree, Newcastle, Edinburgh, Aberystwyth and Hay-on-Wye. Mexican publisher Eduardo Rabasa of Editorial Sexto Piso was chosen as the inaugural winner. The award was presented by Jude Kelly, OBE, a British Council board member.

== IYPY 2005 ==
Finalists of the 2005 edition came from Argentina, Bulgaria, Latvia, Lebanon, Poland, Romania, Russia, South Africa, Thailand and Turkey, and Maria Deskur of Muchomor Publishers from Poland was chosen as the winner. Maria used her award to publish the teenage novel Operation Red Jericho by the British author Joshua Mowll in Polish. The award was presented by Lord Heseltine, of Haymarket Publishing.

== IYPY 2006 ==
In 2006 ten creative young publishers, from Argentina, Colombia, Jordan, Lebanon, Lithuania, Mexico, Oman, Slovenia, South Africa and Thailand, came to the UK to present their work to an international jury chaired by Simon Winder, Publishing Director at Penguin Press. Joanna El-Mir from Lebanese children's publisher was chosen as the winner. The award was presented by Alistair Burtenshaw, the Director of London Book Fair.

== IYPY 2007 ==
The 2007 event had finalists from Argentina, Egypt, Hungary, India, Malta, Romania, Slovenia, South Africa and Syria, and S. Anand of Navayana Publishing in Chennai, India was chosen as the winner. Anand leads the first independent imprint in India to deal exclusively with the issues of caste inequalities and identity politics. The event was preceded by a meeting of finalists from the previous editions, to officially form the IYPY alumni network. The award was presented by Liz Calder, Publishing Director of Bloomsbury.

== IYPE 2008 ==
The 2008 event had finalists from Argentina, Egypt, India, Lebanon, Poland, Saudi Arabia, Slovenia, UAE and Yemen. For the first time, the award went to a book retailer, Nashwan Al-Maghafi, the managing director of Yemen Bookshop, a business that he established in 1995 when he was 19. The award was presented by Cherie Booth QC, the wife of the former British Prime Minister and a longstanding supporter of the programme.

== See also ==
- Creative industries
- International Young Music Entrepreneur of the Year
- International Young Design Entrepreneur of the Year
