= Parkinson's UK =

Parkinson's research and support charity

Parkinson's UK is a Parkinson's research and support charity in the United Kingdom. In April 2010, the Parkinson's Disease Society changed its name to become Parkinson's UK. Its aims are to improve the quality of life for people affected by Parkinson's and find a cure for the condition.

Parkinson's UK is the largest charity funder of research into Parkinson's in the UK. It funds research aimed at finding better treatments and improving the understanding of Parkinson's and its causes. It raises money through donations, legacies, community fundraising, events and corporate partnerships. The charity offers support and information to people affected by Parkinson's, their families and carers through a network of 465 local groups across England, Wales, Scotland and Northern Ireland.

== History ==
The Parkinson's Disease Society (Parkinson's UK) was formed in February 1969 by Mali Jenkins (4 July 1907 – 11 March 1989). Initially the organisation had 3 simple aims:

- to help patients and their relatives with the problems arising from Parkinson's
- to collect and disseminate information on Parkinson's
- to encourage and provide funds for research into Parkinson's

Parkinson's UK now focuses on research in addition to support. The charity has also expanded to improve services for people affected by Parkinson's through education and training for professionals and campaigning.

=== President ===
Jane Asher has been President of Parkinson's UK since 2007 and has a brother-in-law diagnosed with Parkinson's. Asher has been involved in launching campaigns to improve research into Parkinson's.

== Research ==
Parkinson's UK is the largest charitable funder of Parkinson's research in the UK and have so far invested more than £50million in research. The charity aims to 'find a cure and improve life for everyone affected by Parkinson's'.

In 2009 the charity produced 'Four decades of discovery' – a booklet describing the key research achievements of the charity since 1969 which included the development of new drugs, an improved understanding of Parkinson's, and better diagnosis and care for people with the condition.

In 2010 the charity spent £4.6 million on new Parkinson's research projects and launched a new 5-year research strategy called 'Our plan to cure Parkinson's'. The new strategy focuses on four central challenges:

- Understanding why nerve cells die in Parkinson's
- Developing new animal models of Parkinson's
- Faster, better drug screening
- Finding 'biomarkers' for earlier diagnosis

These priorities reflect the charity's focus on basic laboratory research to understand what causes Parkinson's, how it develops, and translational research to develop new treatments that slow, stop or reverse the condition. The charity also funds research to help better understand Parkinson's to improve treatment and care for people currently living with the condition.

The charity produces a free research magazine, Progress, once a year discussing current Parkinson's research.

=== Grant schemes ===
Parkinson's UK provides funding to UK-based researchers through a range of grants schemes, including:

- Project grants – tackling major research challenges
- Innovation grants – exploring original research ideas
- Career development awards – nurturing outstanding talent
- PhD studentships – attracting the best graduates

Parkinson's UK is a member of the Association of Medical Research Charities (AMRC). This means that every application for research funding is subject to the same strict and transparent review process and is rigorously assessed by an independent panel of experts and people affected by Parkinson's.

=== Parkinson's UK Brain Bank ===
Parkinson's UK funds the Parkinson's UK Brain Bank at Imperial College London which provides brain tissue to UK and international Parkinson's researchers.

In April 2009 Parkinson's UK held an appeal to increase the number of people signed up to the brain donor register. Jane Asher, Jeremy Paxman and John Stapleton were some of the people who pledged to donate their brain to Parkinson's research following the campaign.

== Criticism ==
In June 2011 the charity was one of four organisations subject to a national boycott campaign by an animal rights group regarding their usage of animal testing. "Animal Aid plans to take out a series of newspaper adverts urging the public to stop giving money to Cancer Research UK, the British Heart Foundation, the Alzheimer's Society and Parkinson's UK unless they end their support for animal testing."

== See also ==
- Parkinson's disease
