= Pyrimidinylpiperazine =

Chemical compound

Names
- Preferred IUPAC name 2-(Piperazin-1-yl)pyrimidine

Identifiers
CAS Number	20980-22-7
3D model (JSmol)	Interactive image
ChEBI	CHEBI:166562
ChEMBL	ChEMBL724
ChemSpider	80080
ECHA InfoCard	100.040.107
EC Number	244-135-5
PubChem CID	88747
UNII	H3B5B38F56
CompTox Dashboard (EPA)	DTXSID00864967
- InChI: InChI=1S/C8H12N4/c1-2-10-8(11-3-1)12-6-4-9-5-7-12/h1-3,9H,4-7H2 Key: MRBFGEHILMYPTF-UHFFFAOYSA-N; InChI=1S/C8H12N4/c1-2-10-8(11-3-1)12-6-4-9-5-7-12/h1-3,9H,4-7H2; InChI=1S/C8H12N4/c1-2-10-8(11-3-1)12-6-4-9-5-7-12/h1-3,9H,4-7H2 Key: MRBFGEHILMYPTF-UHFFFAOYSA-N
- SMILES: n1cccnc1N2CCNCC2

Properties
Chemical formula	C_{8}H_{12}N_{4}
Molar mass	164.21 g/mol

Hazards
- GHS labelling
Pictograms	(GHS05: Corrosive) (GHS07: Exclamation mark)
Signal word	Danger
Hazard statements	H314, H315, H319, H335
Precautionary statements	P260, P264, P271, P280, P301+P330+P331, P302+P352, P303+P361+P353, P304+P340, P305+P351+P338, P310, P312, P321, P332+P313, P337+P313, P362, P363, P403+P233, P405, P501
- Except where otherwise noted, data are given for materials in their standard state (at 25 °C [77 °F], 100 kPa). verify (what is ?) Infobox references

1-(2-Pyrimidinyl)piperazine (1-PP, 1-PmP) is a chemical compound and piperazine derivative. It is known to act as an antagonist of the α_{2}-adrenergic receptor (K_{i} = 7.3–40 nM) and, to a much lesser extent, as a partial agonist of the 5-HT_{1A} receptor (K_{i} = 414 nM; E_{max} = 54%). It has negligible affinity for the dopamine D_{2}, D_{3}, and D_{4} receptors (K_{i} > 10,000 nM) and does not appear to have significant affinity for the α_{1}-adrenergic receptors. Its crystal structure has been determined.

== Derivatives ==
A number of pyrimidinylpiperazine derivatives are drugs, including:

- Buspirone – anxiolytic
- Dasatinib – anticancer agent
- Eptapirone – anxiolytic
- Gepirone – anxiolytic (indicated for Major depressive disorder)
- Ipsapirone – anxiolytic
- Piribedil – antiparkinsonian agent
- Revospirone – anxiolytic
- Tandospirone – anxiolytic
- Tirilazad – neuroprotective agent
- Umespirone – anxiolytic
- Zalospirone – anxiolytic

The anxiolytics are also classified as azapirones due to the azaspirodecanedione moiety in their structures. 1-PP is a common metabolite of most or all of the listed agents. Alnespirone, binospirone, and enilospirone, despite being azapirones, are not piperazines and therefore do not metabolize to 1-PP, and while perospirone and tiospirone are piperazines, they are instead benzothiazole-substituted piperazines and do not metabolize to 1-PP either.

== See also ==
- Substituted piperazine
- Pyridinylpiperazine
- Phenylpiperazine
- Diphenylmethylpiperazine
- Benzylpiperazine
