= Azaspirodecanedione =

Names
- Preferred IUPAC name 8-Azaspiro[4.5]decane-7,9-dione
- Other names 1,1-cyclopentanediacetimide; 3,3-tetramethyleneglutarimide

Identifiers
CAS Number	1075-89-4
3D model (JSmol)	Interactive image
ChemSpider	120592
ECHA InfoCard	100.102.618
PubChem CID	136843
UNII	VVJ9W0K7W1
CompTox Dashboard (EPA)	DTXSID1057616
- InChI: InChI=1S/C9H13NO2/c11-7-5-9(3-1-2-4-9)6-8(12)10-7/h1-6H2,(H,10,11,12) Key: YRTHJMQKDCXPAY-UHFFFAOYSA-N
- SMILES: C1CCC2(C1)CC(=O)NC(=O)C2

Properties
Chemical formula	C_{9}H_{13}NO_{2}
Molar mass	167.21 g/mol
- Except where otherwise noted, data are given for materials in their standard state (at 25 °C [77 °F], 100 kPa). verify (what is ?) Infobox references

Azaspirodecanedione is a chemical compound with the formula C_{9}H_{13}NO_{2}. It is a component of the chemical structures of several of the azapirones.

== Concrete List ==
1. Alnespirone
2. Binospirone
3. BMY-7,378
4. Buspirone
5. Gepirone (Dimethyl variation)
6. Mdl-72832 [113777-33-6]
7. MDL73975 [159650-30-3]
8. MJ-7378 [21103-03-7] Ref:
9. ORG13514
10. ORG12653
11. SNAP-8719 [255893-38-0] Patent:
12. Tiospirone

== See also ==
- Azapirone
- Azaspirodecane
- Glutarimide
- Ketone
- Spirodecanedione
