= Spirodecanedione =

Names
- Preferred IUPAC name Spiro[4.5]decane-1,4-dione

Identifiers
CAS Number	39984-92-4
3D model (JSmol)	Interactive image
ChemSpider	9074313
PubChem CID	10899053
UNII	65G3VZ9MEX
CompTox Dashboard (EPA)	DTXSID901029410
- InChI: InChI=1S/C10H14O2/c11-8-4-5-9(12)10(8)6-2-1-3-7-10/h1-7H2 Key: QMNFMSMVFOZHBM-UHFFFAOYSA-N; InChI=1S/C10H14O2/c11-8-4-5-9(12)10(8)6-2-1-3-7-10/h1-7H2; InChI=1S/C10H14O2/c11-8-4-5-9(12)10(8)6-2-1-3-7-10/h1-7H2 Key: QMNFMSMVFOZHBM-UHFFFAOYSA-N
- SMILES: O=C1CCC(=O)C12CCCCC2

Properties
Chemical formula	C_{10}H_{14}O_{2}
Molar mass	166.220 g·mol^{−1}
- Except where otherwise noted, data are given for materials in their standard state (at 25 °C [77 °F], 100 kPa). verify (what is ?) Infobox references

Spirodecanedione is a chemical compound. It features spirodecane with two ketones attached.

== See also ==
- Spirodecane
- Azaspirodecanedione
- Glutarimide
- Ketone
