= Saccharin =

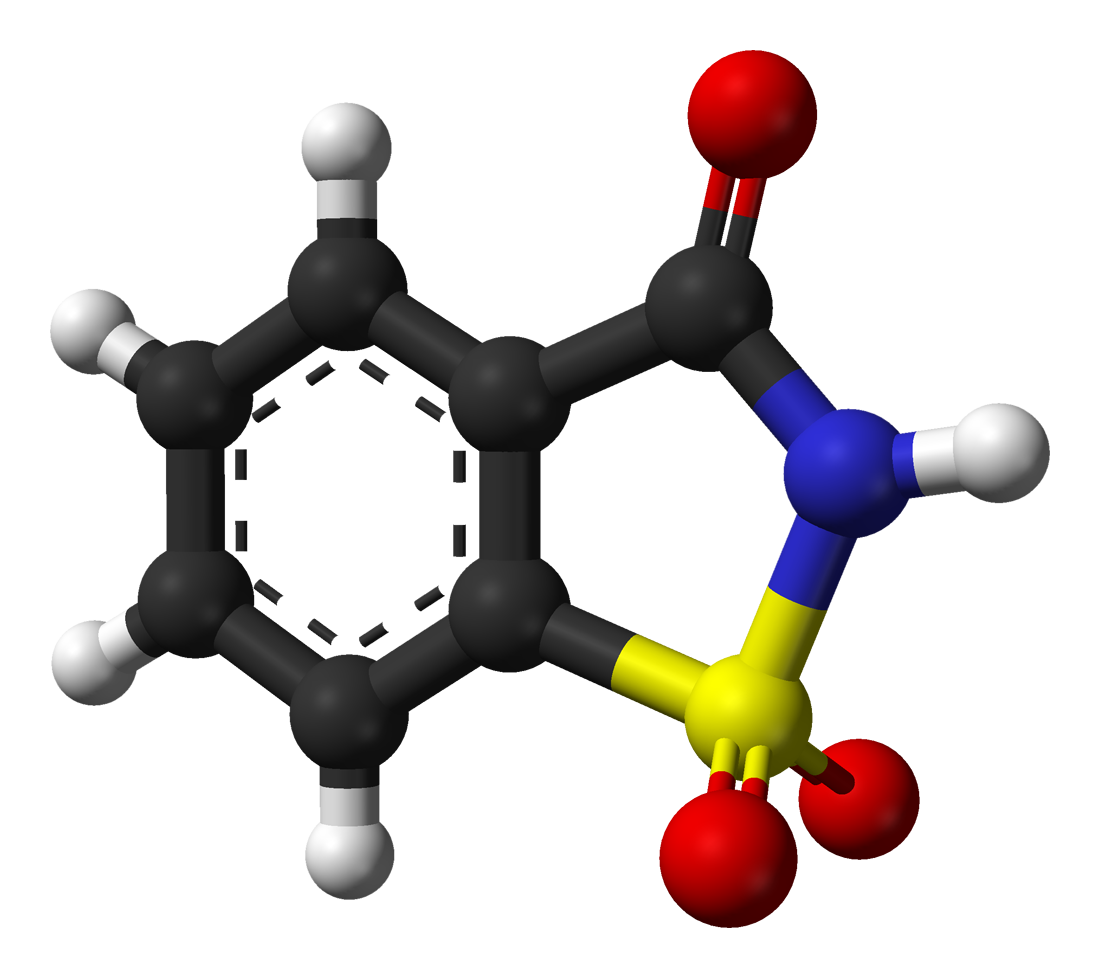

Names
- Preferred IUPAC name 1H-1λ^{6},2-Benzothiazole-1,1,3(2H)-trione
- Other names: ortho-benzoic sulfimide; ortho sulphobenzimide

Identifiers
CAS Number	81-07-2
3D model (JSmol)	Interactive image
ChEBI	CHEBI:32111
ChEMBL	ChEMBL310671
ChemSpider	4959
ECHA InfoCard	100.001.202
E number	E954 (glazing agents, ...)
IUPHAR/BPS	5432
KEGG	D01085
PubChem CID	5143
UNII	FST467XS7D
CompTox Dashboard (EPA)	DTXSID5021251
- InChI: InChI=1S/C7H5NO3S/c9-7-5-3-1-2-4-6(5)12(10,11)8-7/h1-4H,(H,8,9) Key: CVHZOJJKTDOEJC-UHFFFAOYSA-N; InChI=1/C7H5NO3S/c9-7-5-3-1-2-4-6(5)12(10,11)8-7/h1-4H,(H,8,9) Key: CVHZOJJKTDOEJC-UHFFFAOYAR
- SMILES: O=C2c1ccccc1S(=O)(=O)N2

Properties
Chemical formula	C_{7}H_{5}NO_{3}S
Molar mass	183.18 g·mol^{−1}
Appearance	White crystalline solid
Density	0.828 g/cm^{3}
Melting point	228.8 to 229.7 °C (443.8 to 445.5 °F; 501.9 to 502.8 K)
Solubility in water	1 g per 290 mL
Acidity (pK_{a})	1.6
- Except where otherwise noted, data are given for materials in their standard state (at 25 °C [77 °F], 100 kPa). verify (what is ?) Infobox references

Saccharin, also called saccharine, benzosulfimide, or E954, or used in saccharin sodium or saccharin calcium forms, is a non-nutritive artificial sweetener. Saccharin is a sultam that is about 500 times sweeter than sucrose, but has a bitter or metallic aftertaste, especially at high concentrations. It is used to sweeten products, such as drinks, candies, baked goods, tobacco products, excipients, and for masking the bitter taste of some medicines. It appears as white crystals and is odorless.

== Etymology ==
Saccharin derives its name from the word "saccharine", meaning "sugary". Both words are derived from the Greek word σάκχαρον (sákkharon) meaning "gravel". Similarly, saccharose is an obsolete name for sucrose (table sugar).

== Properties ==
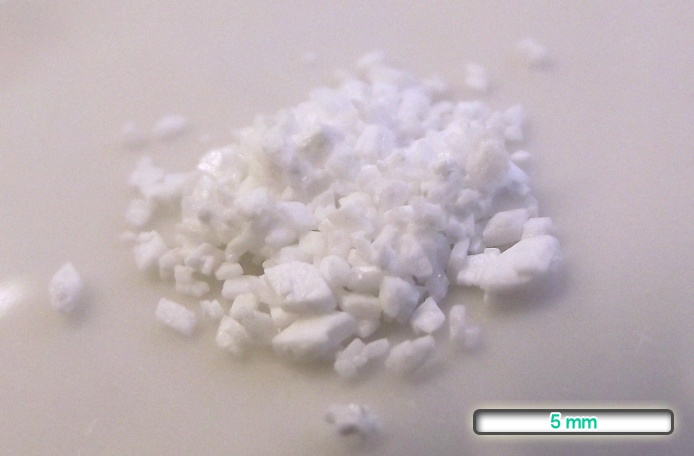
Sodium salt of saccharin, a white powder

Saccharin is heat-stable. It does not react chemically with other food ingredients; thus, it stores well. Blends of saccharin with other sweeteners are often used to compensate for each sweetener's weaknesses and faults. A 10:1 cyclamate–saccharin blend is common in countries where both these sweeteners are legal; in this blend, each sweetener masks the other's offtaste. Saccharin is often used with aspartame in diet carbonated soft drinks, so some sweetness remains should the fountain syrup be stored beyond aspartame's relatively short shelf life.

In its acid form, saccharin is not water-soluble. The form used as an artificial sweetener is usually its sodium salt. The calcium salt is also sometimes used, especially by people restricting their dietary sodium intake. Both salts are highly water-soluble: 0.67 g/ml in water at room temperature.

== Safety and health effects ==
In the 1970s, studies performed on laboratory rats found an association between consumption of high doses of saccharin and the development of bladder cancer. However, further study determined that this effect was due to a mechanism that is not relevant to humans (deposition of crystals; see § History section). Epidemiological studies have shown no evidence that saccharin is associated with bladder cancer in humans. The International Agency for Research on Cancer originally classified saccharin in Group 2B ("possibly carcinogenic to humans") based on the rat studies, but downgraded it to Group 3 ("not classifiable as to the carcinogenicity to humans") upon review of the subsequent research.

Saccharin has no food energy and no nutritional value. It is safe to consume for individuals with diabetes or prediabetes.

People with sulfonamide allergies can experience allergic reactions to saccharin, although it has been suggested that this may be due to a general predisposition to allergic reactions rather than a specific cross-reaction between antimicrobial sulfonamides and non-antimicrobial ones (like saccharin).

== History ==
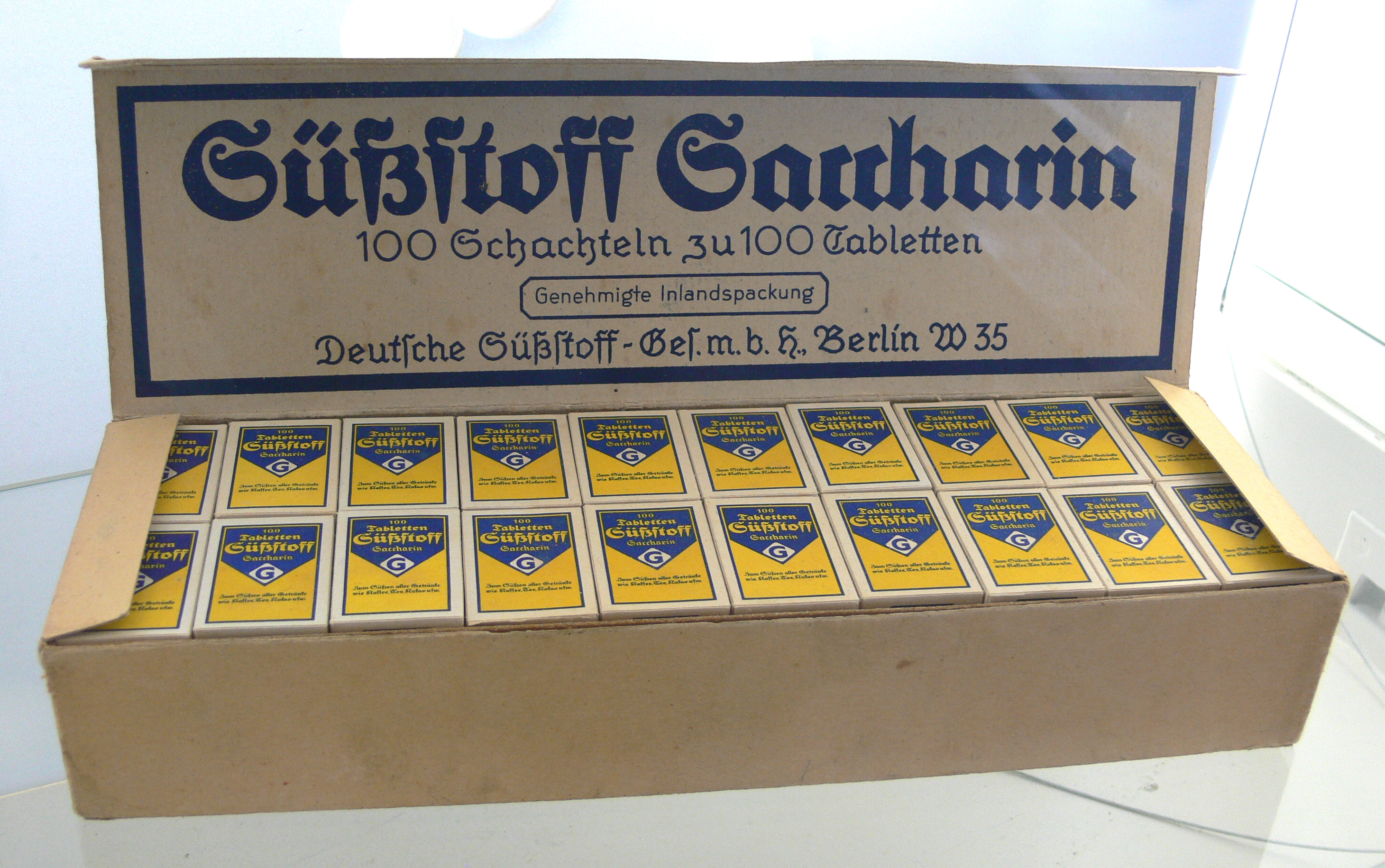
Saccharin, historical wrapping, Sugar Museum (Berlin)

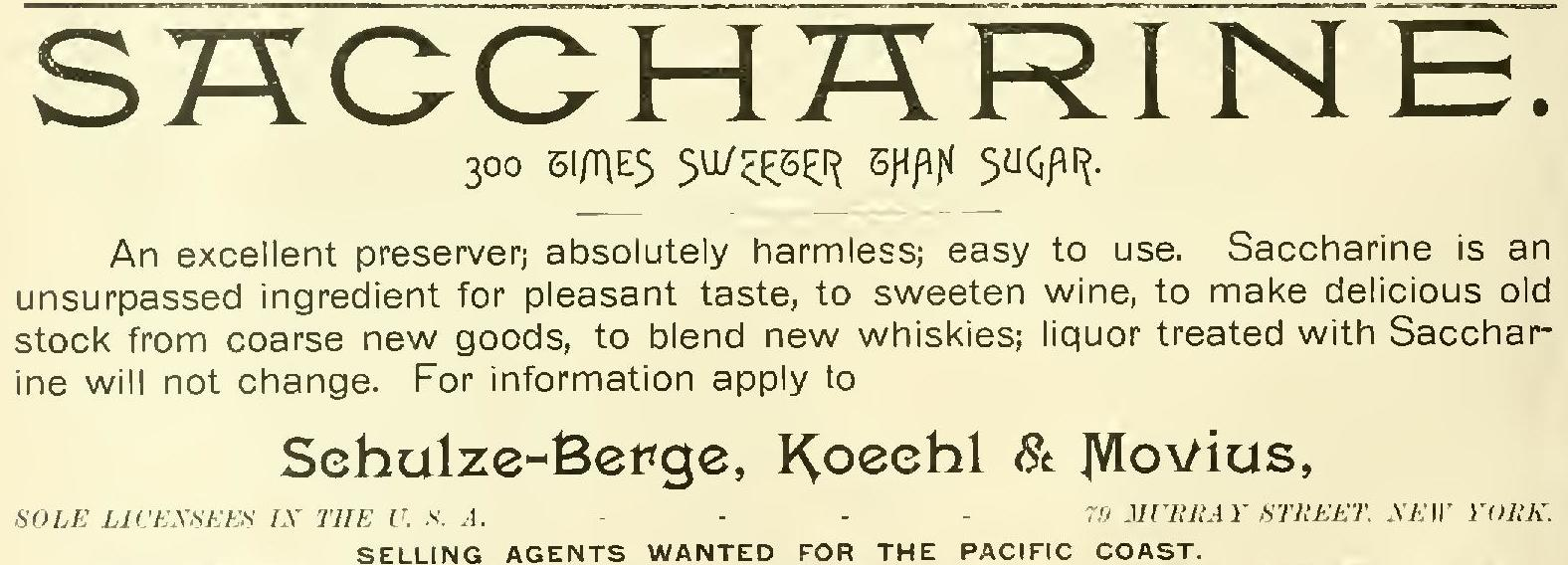
1893 ad

Saccharin was produced first in 1879, by Constantin Fahlberg, a chemist working on coal tar derivatives in Ira Remsen's laboratory at Johns Hopkins University. Fahlberg noticed a sweet taste on his hand one evening, and connected this with the compound benzoic sulfimide on which he had been working that day. Fahlberg and Remsen published articles on benzoic sulfimide in 1879 and 1880. In 1884, then working on his own in New York City, Fahlberg applied for patents in several countries (including German patents 35211 and 113720), describing methods of producing this substance that he named saccharin. Two years later, he began production of the substance in a factory in a suburb of Magdeburg in Germany. Fahlberg soon grew wealthy, while Remsen believed he deserved credit for substances produced in his laboratory. On the matter, Remsen commented, "Fahlberg is a scoundrel. It nauseates me to hear my name mentioned in the same breath with him."

Although saccharin was commercialized not long after its discovery, until sugar shortages during World War I, its use had not become widespread. Its popularity further increased during the 1960s and 1970s among dieters, since saccharin is a calorie-free sweetener. In the United States, saccharin is often found in restaurants in pink packets; the most popular brand is "Sweet'n Low".

Due to the difficulty of importing sugar from the West Indies during World War I, the British Saccharin Company was founded in 1917 to produce saccharin at its Paragon Works near Accrington, Lancashire. Production was licensed and controlled by the Board of Trade in London. Production continued on the site until 1926.

=== Government regulation ===
Starting in 1907, the U.S. Food and Drug Administration (FDA) began investigating saccharin as a result of the Pure Food and Drug Act. Harvey Wiley, then the director of the bureau of chemistry for the FDA, viewed it as an illegal substitution of a valuable ingredient, sugar, by a less valuable ingredient. In a clash that had career consequences, Wiley told President Theodore Roosevelt, "Everyone who ate that sweet corn was deceived. He thought he was eating sugar, when in point of fact he was eating a coal tar product totally devoid of food value and extremely injurious to health." But Roosevelt himself was a consumer of saccharin, and, in a heated exchange, angrily answered Wiley by stating, "Anybody who says saccharin is injurious to health is an idiot." The episode proved the undoing of Wiley's career.

In 1911, Food Inspection Decision 135 stated that foods containing saccharin were adulterated. However, in 1912, Food Inspection Decision 142 stated that saccharin was not harmful.

More controversy was stirred in 1969 with the discovery of files from the FDA's investigations of 1948 and 1949. These investigations, which had originally argued against saccharin use, were shown to prove little about saccharin being harmful to human health. In 1977, the FDA made an attempt to completely ban the substance, following studies showing that the substance caused bladder cancer in rats. The attempted ban was unsuccessful due to public opposition that was encouraged by industry advertisements, and instead the following label was mandated: "Use of this product may be hazardous to your health. This product contains saccharin which has been determined to cause cancer in laboratory animals". That requirement was dropped in 2000 following new research that concluded humans reacted differently than rats and were not at risk of cancer at typical intake levels. (See also: § Warning label addition and removal below.) The sweetener has continued to be widely used in the United States and is now the third-most popular artificial sweetener behind sucralose and aspartame.

In the European Union, saccharin is also known by the E number (additive code) E954.

The current status of saccharin is that it is allowed in most countries, and countries such as Canada have lifted their previous ban of it as a food additive. The claims that it is associated with bladder cancer were shown to be unfounded in experiments on primates. (It is, however, prohibited to mail saccharin tablets or packets to France.)

Saccharin was formerly on California's list of chemicals known to the state to cause cancer for the purposes of Proposition 65, but it was delisted on April 6, 2001.

==== Warning label addition and removal ====
In 1958, the U.S. Congress amended the Food, Drugs, and Cosmetic Act of 1938 with the Delaney clause to mandate that the FDA not approve substances that "induce cancer in man, or, after tests, [are] found to induce cancer in animals". Studies in laboratory rats during the early 1970s linked saccharin with the development of bladder cancer in rodents. As a consequence, all food containing saccharin was labeled with a warning meeting the requirement of the Saccharin Study and Labeling Act of 1977.

However, in 2000, the warning labels were removed because scientists learned that rodents, unlike humans, have a unique combination of high pH, high calcium phosphate, and high protein levels in their urine. One or more of the proteins that are more prevalent in male rats combine with calcium phosphate and saccharin to produce microcrystals that damage the lining of the bladder. Over time, the rat's bladder responds to this damage by overproducing cells to repair the damage, which leads to tumor formation. Since this does not occur in humans, there is no elevated risk of bladder cancer.

The delisting of saccharin led to legislation repealing the warning label requirement for products containing saccharin. In 2001, both the FDA and the state of California reversed their positions on saccharin, declaring it safe for consumption. The FDA's decision followed a 2000 determination by the U.S. Department of Health and Human Services' National Toxicology Program to remove saccharin from its list of carcinogens.

The U.S. Environmental Protection Agency has officially removed saccharin and its salts from their list of hazardous constituents and commercial chemical products. In a release in December 2010, the EPA stated that saccharin is no longer considered a potential hazard to human health.

== Chemistry ==
=== Preparation ===
Saccharin can be produced in various ways. The original route by Remsen and Fahlberg starts with toluene; another route begins with o-chlorotoluene. Sulfonation of toluene by chlorosulfonic acid gives the ortho and para substituted sulfonyl chlorides. The ortho isomer is separated and converted to the sulfonamide with ammonia. Oxidation of the methyl substituent gives the carboxylic acid, which cyclicizes to give saccharin free acid:

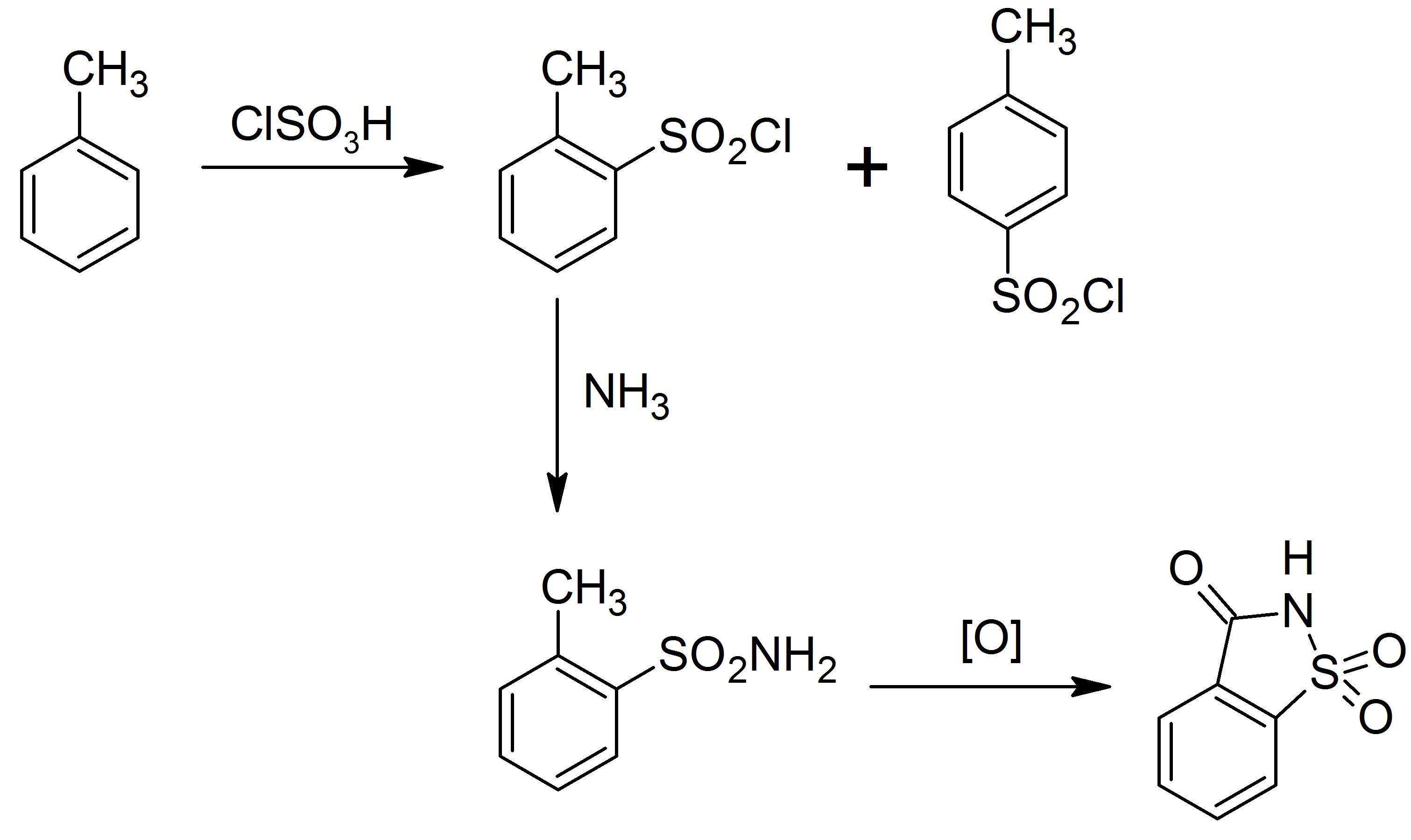

In 1950, an improved synthesis was developed at the Maumee Chemical Company of Toledo, Ohio. In this synthesis, the methyl anthranilate successively reacts with nitrous acid (from sodium nitrite and hydrochloric acid), sulfur dioxide, chlorine, and then ammonia to yield saccharin:

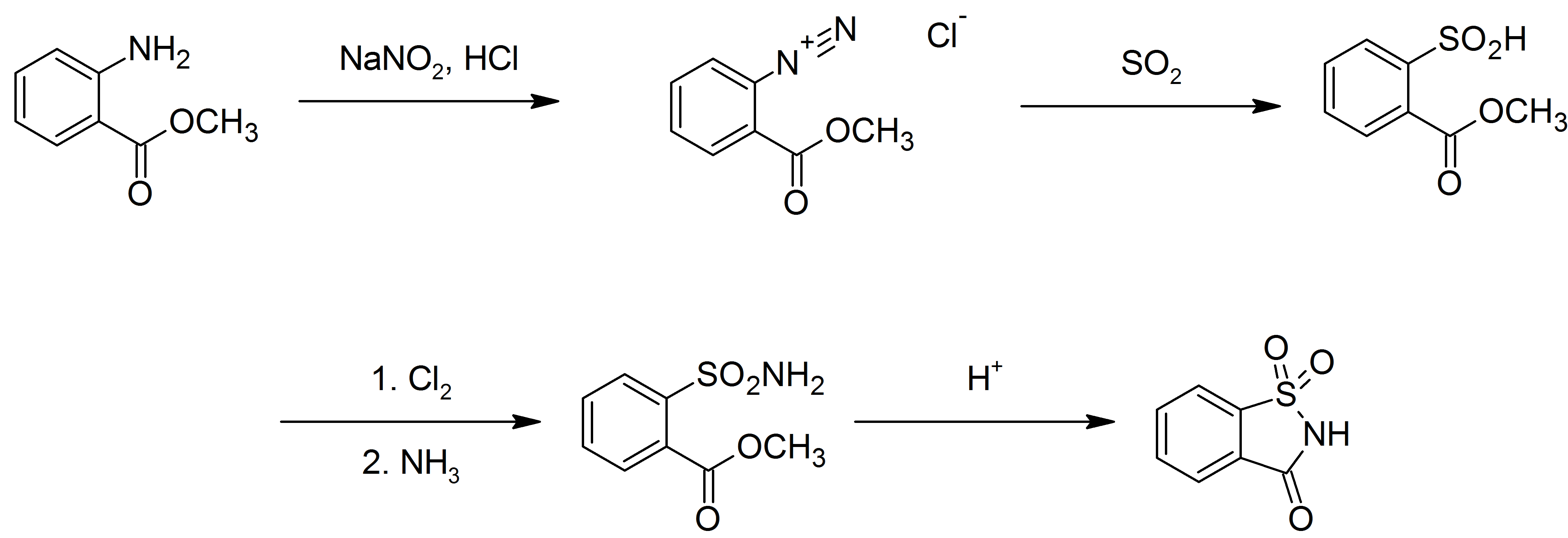

=== Properties and reactions ===
The free acid of saccharin has a low pK_{a} of 1.6 (the acidic hydrogen being that attached to the nitrogen). Saccharin can be used to prepare exclusively disubstituted amines from alkyl halides via a nucleophilic substitution, followed by a Gabriel synthesis.

=== Drugs ===
Saccharin is a versatile precursor useful in the synthesis of the following drug molecules:

Piroxicam, sudoxicam, isoxicam, meloxicam, droxicam, ampiroxicam, supidimide, revospirone, repinotan, phenolsulfonphthalein (PSP), metacresol purple, probenazole, SCP-1 [182502-68-7], SCP-123(ss), DU-125530 [161611-99-0], AZ36041 [136941-85-0], GL-1196 [591242-70-5], PF-9184 [1221971-47-6], SDZ 216-525 [141533-35-9], PCA 50941 [136941-85-0], PCA-50938 [136941-70-3], ethametsulfuron-methyl, chlorimuron, dichlobentiazox, ipsapirone, & LB-50016 [228579-02-0].

== See also ==
- Acesulfame potassium
- Aspartame
- Neotame
- Phthalimide
- Saccharose
- Sodium cyclamate
- Steviol glycoside
- Sucralose
- Sugar substitute
- Xylitol
