= Tripamide =

Chemical compound

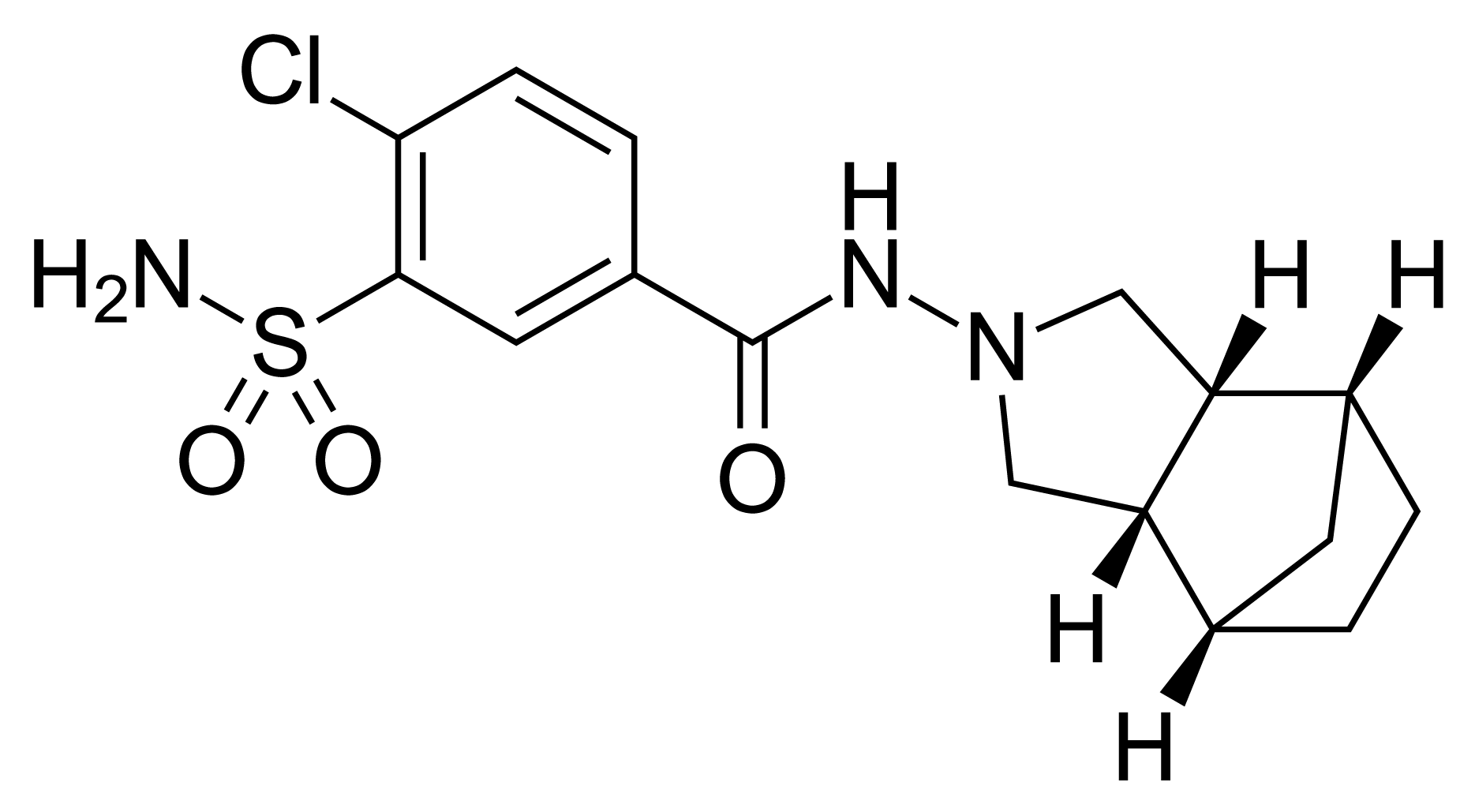

Clinical data
- AHFS/Drugs.com: International Drug Names
- Routes of administration: Oral
- ATC code: none

Legal status
- Legal status: In general: ℞ (Prescription only)

Identifiers
- IUPAC name: 3-(aminosulfonyl)-4-chloro-N-[(3aR,4S,7R,7aS)-octahydro-2H-4,7-methanoisoindol-2-yl]benzamide
- CAS Number: 73803-48-2
- PubChem CID: 636401
- DrugBank: DB15959
- ChemSpider: 4445396
- UNII: G36A0E9CVT
- ChEMBL: ChEMBL2104484
- CompTox Dashboard (EPA): DTXSID2057817

Chemical and physical data
- Formula: C_{16}H_{20}ClN_{3}O_{3}S
- Molar mass: 369.86 g·mol^{−1}
- 3D model (JSmol): Interactive image
- SMILES: C1C[C@@H]2C[C@H]1[C@@H]3[C@H]2CN(C3)NC(=O)C4=CC(=C(C=C4)Cl)S(=O)(=O)N
- InChI: InChI=1S/C16H20ClN3O3S/c17-14-4-3-11(6-15(14)24(18,22)23)16(21)19-20-7-12-9-1-2-10(5-9)13(12)8-20/h3-4,6,9-10,12-13H,1-2,5,7-8H2,(H,19,21)(H2,18,22,23)/t9-,10+,12-,13+; Key:UHLOVGKIEARANS-NIFPGPBJSA-N

Tripamide (INN) is a diuretic.

Diels-Alder reaction between maleimide and cyclopentadiene gives a compound that is called noreximide [6319-06-8]. This compound is of utility not merely in the production of tripamide, but also in the synthesis of taglutimide, lurasidone, tandospirone, perospirone (close) and lastly a pesticide that is called MGK 264.

Tecovirimat has a structure that is related to tripamide but with some important differences.
