= C22H31N3O3 =

The molecular formula C_{22}H_{31}N_{3}O_{3} may refer to:

- BMY-7378, a 5-HT_{1A} receptor weak partial agonist/antagonist and α_{1D}-adrenergic receptor antagonist
- MDMB-CHMINACA, an indazole-based synthetic cannabinoid
