= C8H12N4 =

The molecular formula C_{8}H_{12}N_{4} (molar mass: 164.21 g/mol, exact mass: 164.1062 u) may refer to:

- Azobisisobutyronitrile (AIBN)
- 1-(2-Pyrimidinyl)piperazine (1-PP or 1-PmP)
