= Saccharin Study and Labeling Act of 1977 =

US law

- Long title: An Act to require studies concerning carcinogenic and other toxic substances in food, the regulation of such food, the impurities in and toxicity of saccharin, and the health benefits, if any, resulting from the use of nonnutritive sweeteners; to prohibit for 18 months the Secretary of Health, Education, and Welfare from taking certain action restricting the continued use of saccharin as a food, drug, and cosmetic; to require certain labels and notices for foods containing saccharin; and for other purposes.
- Acronyms (colloquial): SSLA, SSLAA
- Nicknames: Saccharin Study, Labeling and Advertising Act
- Enacted by: the 95th United States Congress
- Effective: November 23, 1977

Citations
- Public law: 95-203
- Statutes at Large: 91 Stat. 1451

Codification
- Titles amended: 21 U.S.C.: Food and Drugs
- U.S.C. sections amended: 21 U.S.C. ch. 9, subch. I § 301; 21 U.S.C. ch. 9, subch. IV § 343a

Legislative history
- Introduced in the Senate as S. 1750 by Ted Kennedy (D–MA) on June 23, 1977; Committee consideration by Senate Human Resources, Senate Commerce, Science, and Transportation, House Interstate and Foreign Commerce; Passed the Senate on September 15, 1977 (87-7); Passed the House on October 17, 1977 (375-23, in lieu of H.R. 8518); Reported by the joint conference committee on November 3, 1977; agreed to by the House on November 3, 1977 (agreed) and by the Senate on November 4, 1977 (agreed); Signed into law by President Jimmy Carter on November 23, 1977

Saccharin Study and Labeling Act of 1977 or Saccharin Study, Labeling and Advertising Act was a United States federal statute endorsing requirements for a scientific observation regarding the impurities in, potential toxicity, and problematic carcinogenicity of saccharin, a sugar substitute. The Act of Congress invoked an immediate eighteen month moratorium prohibiting the Secretary of Health, Education, and Welfare from pursuing regulatory implications by limiting the production and use of saccharin. The Act codified a warning label requirement advocating the non-nutritive sweetener had been discovered to yield carcinogenicity in laboratory animals.

The S. 1750 legislation was passed by the 95th Congressional session and signed into law by the 39th President of the United States Jimmy Carter on November 23, 1977.

== Research Perspective ==
In 1948 to 1949, U.S. Food and Drug Administration pathologists conducted laboratory analyses on Osborne-Mendel rat specimens concluding lymphosarcoma after a two-year laboratory analysis. In 1951, scientists collaboratively suggested the white crystalline sweetening agent could be a possible carcinogen. In 1958, saccharin was registered Generally Recognized As Safe (GRAS) by decree of the food additives amendment retaining the non-nutritive sweetener as a marketable product for human consumption.

In 1972 to 1973 after much growing concern among the United States population, the U.S. Food and Drug Administration and Wisconsin Alumni Research Foundation (WARF) led carcinogenic studies concluding the incidence of bladder tumors in Charles River Sprague-Dawley rat specimens. As a result of the laboratory analyses, the U.S. Food and Drug Administration revoked the Generally Recognized As Safe (GRAS) classification and imposed regulatory procedures restricting the use of saccharin in food products. In 1974, the National Academy of Sciences published a scientific review emphasizing saccharin could not be identified as the carcinogenic agent of benign tumors and malignant tumors due to equivocal analysis procedures, inadequate scientific experimental design, and potential impurities.

In 1977, the Canadian Health Protection Branch Study was completed on Charles River Sprague-Dawley rat specimens concluding lymphoma in the blood cells. The Canadian carcinogenic study encouraged Canada to remove saccharin as a marketable product for human consumption in 1977.

== Provisions of the Act ==
The Act established criteria for the scientific study of saccharin with key elements regarding the display, notification, and labeling of the non-nutritive sweetener.

=== Saccharin and sweetening agent variants ===
'Saccharin' includes calcium saccharin, sodium saccharin, and ammonium saccharin.

=== Saccharin and conduct of study ===
(A) The Secretary of Health, Education, and Welfare shall arrange an analytical study to be conducted and based on available information of;

- Current technical capabilities are to be utilized to predict the direct or secondary carcinogenicity or other toxicity in humans of substances which are added to, become a part of, or naturally occur in, food and which have been found to cause cancer in animals.
- Direct and indirect health benefits and risks to individuals from foods which contain carcinogenic or other toxic substances.
- Existing means of evaluating the risks to health from the carcinogenicity or other toxicity of such substances, the existing means of evaluating the health benefits of foods containing such substances, and the existing statutory authority for, and appropriateness of, weighing such risks against such benefits.
- Instances in which requirements to restrict or prohibit the use of such substances do not accord with the relationship between such risks and benefits.
- Relationship between existing Federal food regulatory policy and existing Federal regulatory policy applicable to carcinogenic and other toxic substances used as other than foods.

(B) The Secretary shall arrange a study to be conducted and to determine to the extent feasible of;

- Chemical identity of any impurities contained in commercially used saccharin.
- Toxicity or potential toxicity of any such impurities, including the carcinogenicity or potential carcinogenicity in humans.
- Health benefits, if any, to humans resulting from the use of non-nutritive sweeteners in general and saccharin in particular.

=== Entity to conduct study ===
National Academy of Sciences is to conduct the studies whereby the actual expenses incurred by the Academy directly related to the non-nutritive sweeteners studies will be incurred by the Department of Health, Education, and Welfare. If the National Academy of Sciences declines the request to conduct any such study under such an arrangement, then the Secretary shall enter into a similar arrangement with another appropriate public or nonprofit private entity to conduct the non-nutritive sweeteners study.

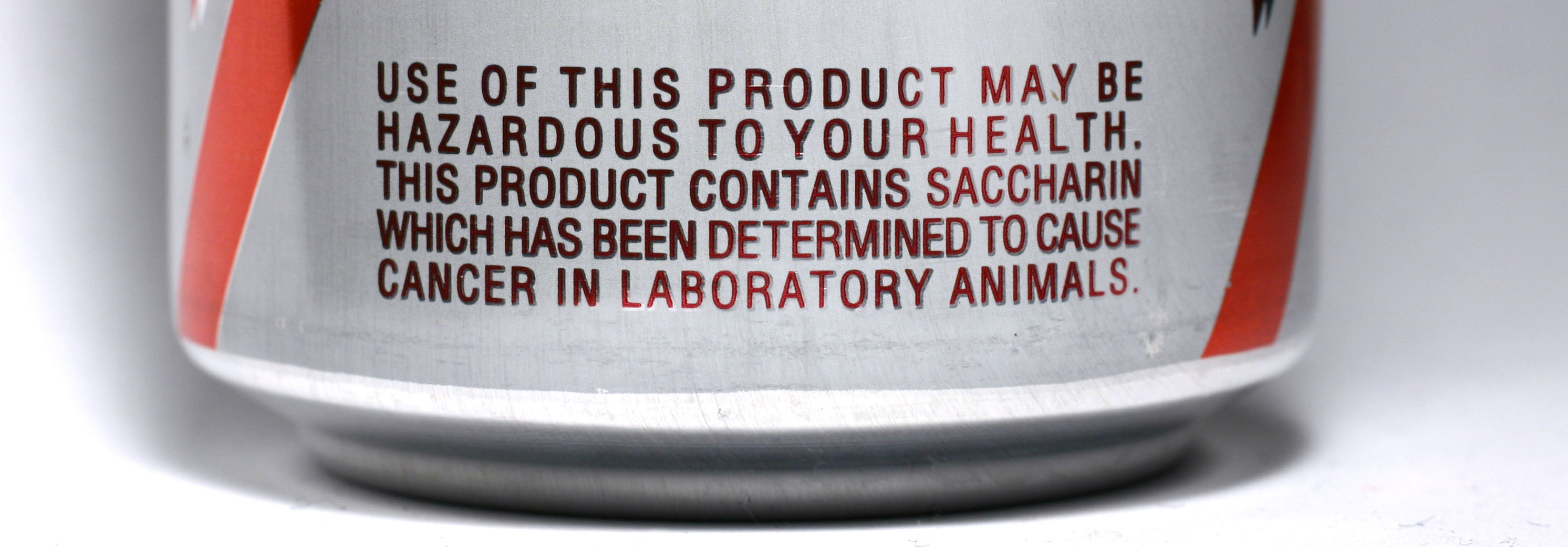
Saccharin warning on a Diet Dr Pepper can.

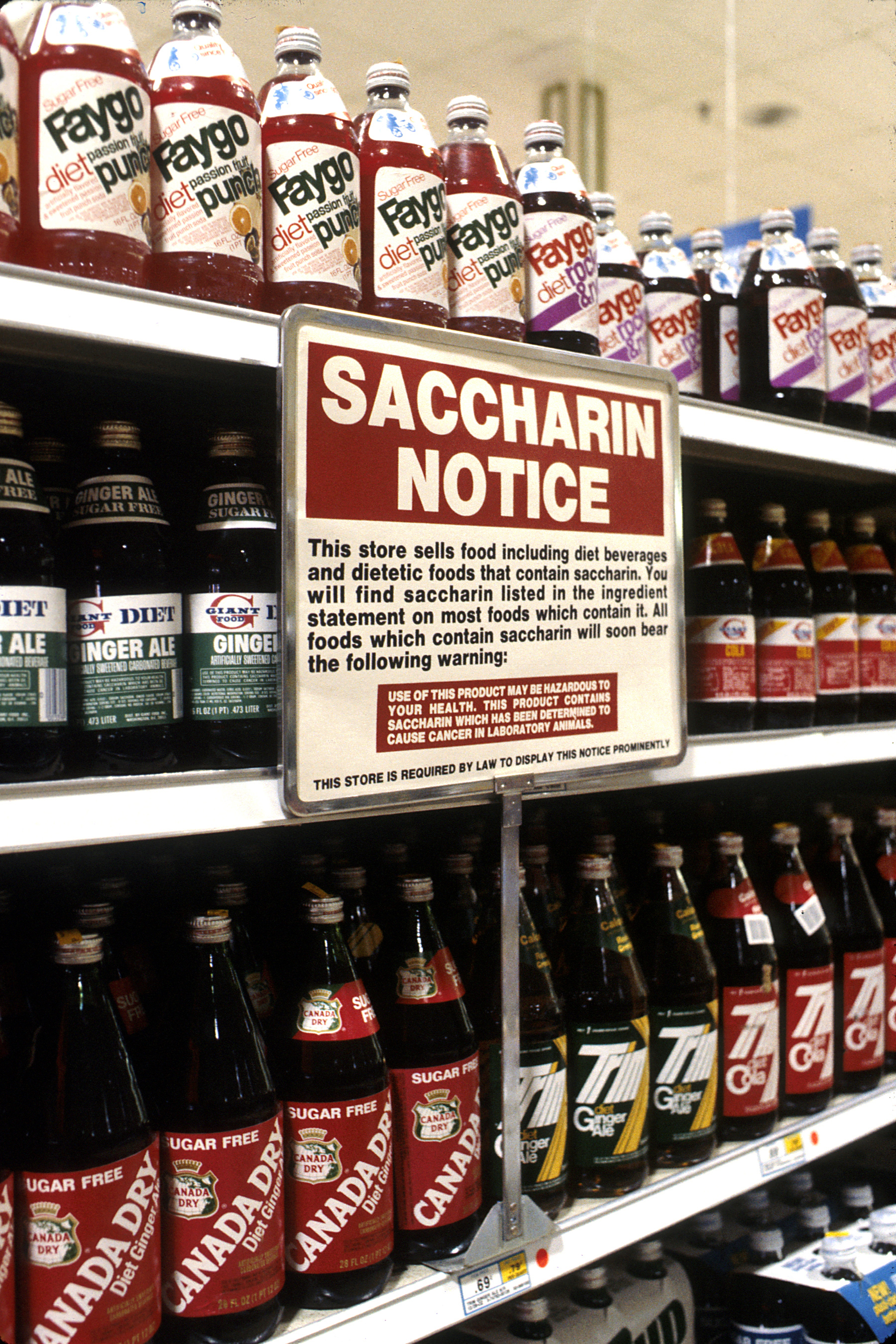
Non-nutritive sweetened sodas with a saccharin warning label.

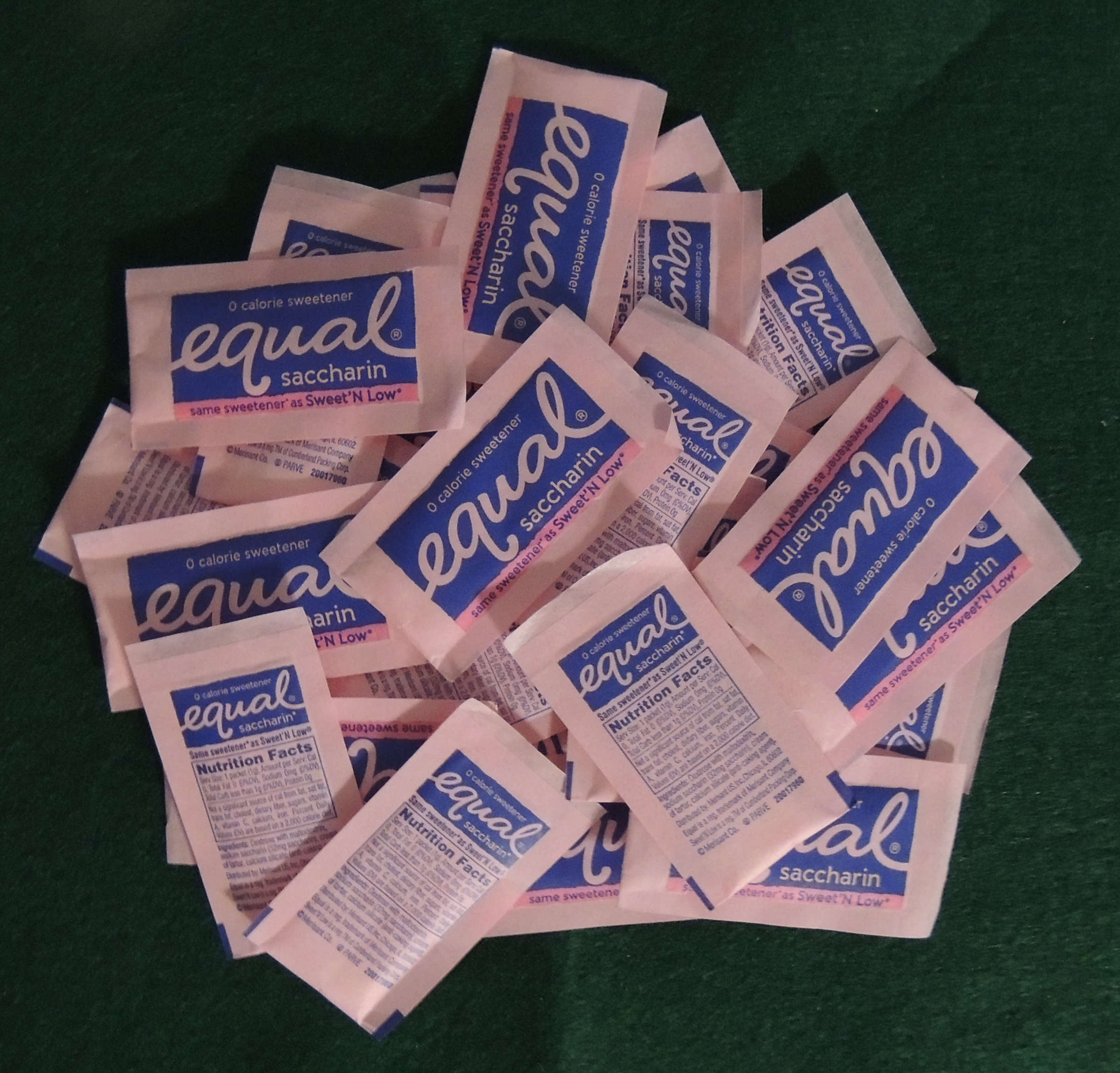
Saccharin sweetener with Equal branding

=== Reports to congressional committees ===
Within twelve months of the date of the enactment of the Act a report is to be submitted to the Senate Committee on Human Resources and the House Committee on Interstate and Foreign Commerce;

- Results of the study conducted shall include supporting data and other materials provided by the entity which conducted the study.
- Any action proposed to be taken on the basis of the results of the study.

Within fifteen months of the date of the enactment of the Act a report is to be submitted to the Senate Committee on Human Resources and the House Committee on Interstate and Foreign Commerce;

- Results of the studies shall include supporting data and other materials provided by the entity which conducted the study
- Recommendations, if any, of such entity for legislative and administrative action
- Recommendations for legislative action as the Secretary deems necessary.

=== Labeling requirement ===
If product contains saccharin, a label or labeling shall bear the following statement:

- USE OF THIS PRODUCT MAY BE HAZARDOUS TO YOUR HEALTH. THIS PRODUCT CONTAINS SACCHARIN WHICH HAS BEEN DETERMINED TO CAUSE CANCER IN LABORATORY ANIMALS.

The statement is to be located in a conspicuous place on such label and labeling as proximate as possible to the name of such food and shall appear in conspicuous and legible type in contrast by typography, layout, and color with other printed matter on such label and labeling.

=== Labeling requirement for retail establishments, notice, and display ===
- If it contains saccharin and is offered for sale, but not for immediate consumption, at a retail establishment, unless such retail establishment displays prominently, where such food is held for sale shall bear the labeling statement.
- Each manufacturer of food which contains saccharin and which is offered for sale by retail establishments but not for immediate consumption shall bear the labeling statement.
- The Secretary may by regulation review and revise or remove the labeling requirement if a determination of such action is necessary to reflect the current state of knowledge concerning saccharin.
- The Secretary shall by regulation prescribe the form, text, and manner of display of the notice and such other matters as may be required for the implementation of the requirements. Regulations shall be promulgated after an oral hearing but without regard to the National Environmental Policy Act of 1969 and chapter 5 of title 5, United States Code. In any action brought for judicial review of any such regulation, the reviewing court may not postpone the effective date of such regulation.

=== Vending machines and health risk statement requirements ===
Regulation requires vending machines through which food containing saccharin is sold to bear a statement of the risks to health which may be presented by the use of saccharin. Regulation requires such statement to be located in a conspicuous place on such vending machine and as proximate as possible to the name of each food containing saccharin which is sold through such machine. Any food containing saccharin which is sold in a vending machine which does not meet the labeling requirement is to be considered a misbranded food.

=== Information availability and distribution ===
- Prepare information respecting the nature of the controversy surrounding the use of food containing saccharin.
- Provide for the distribution of such information for display by retail establishments where such food is sold but not for immediate consumption. The Secretary may review and revise such information if a determination of such action is necessary to reflect the current state of knowledge concerning the risks to health presented by the use of saccharin.

== Amendments to 1977 Act ==
U.S. Congressional amendments to the Saccharin Study and Labeling Act of 1977.

Date of Enactment	Public Law No.	U.S. Statute	U.S. Bill No.	U.S. Presidential Administration
June 17, 1980	P.L. 96-273	94 Stat. 536	H.R. 4453	Jimmy E. Carter
August 14, 1981	P.L. 97-42	95 Stat. 946	S. 1278	Ronald W. Reagan
April 22, 1983	P.L. 98-22	97 Stat. 173	S. 89	Ronald W. Reagan
May 24, 1985	P.L. 99-46	99 Stat. 81	S. 484	Ronald W. Reagan
April 1, 1996	P.L. 104-124	110 Stat. 882	H.R. 1787	William J. Clinton

== Repeal of Saccharin Clause ==
The saccharin health risks clause, 21 U.S.C. § 343a, was repealed by the United States 106th Congressional session enactment of the Consolidated Appropriations Act of 2001. The 2001 Appropriations Act was confirmed as a federal law by the 42nd President of the United States Bill Clinton on December 21, 2000.
