= Fabre-Kramer Pharmaceuticals =

- Company type: S Corporation
- Industry: Pharmaceuticals
- Founded: 1992
- Headquarters: Houston, Texas
- Key people: Stephen Kramer (CEO) Ed Koehler (Executive Vice President, CFO)
- Products: Travivo (Gepirone ER), FKB01MD, FKW00GA, FKF02SC, FKK01PD
- Website: www.fabrekramer.com

Fabre-Kramer Pharmaceuticals is a pharmaceutical company that specializes in the development of psychotropic drugs. Products in their current development pipeline include gepirone and FKB01MD for major depression, gepirone and FKW00GA for social anxiety disorder, gepirone for hypoactive sexual desire disorder, FKF02SC for schizophrenia, and FKK01PD for Parkinson's disease.

The company has also conducted clinical studies on a gepirone extended release formulation for major depression.

In 2007, Fabre-Kramer Pharmaceuticals along with GlaxoSmithKline (GSK) received a 'not approvable' letter from the US Food and Drug Administration, for a gepirone extended release drug, an antidepressant treatment for adults.
