= Umespirone =

Anxiolytic and antipsychotic drug

Clinical data
- Routes of administration: By mouth
- ATC code: none

Legal status
- Legal status: In general: uncontrolled

Pharmacokinetic data
- Elimination half-life: Unknown but effects last much longer than other azapirones, up to 23 hours after a single dose in human clinical studies.

Identifiers
- IUPAC name: 3-butyl-7-[4-[4-(2-methoxyphenyl)piperazin-1-yl]butyl]-9,9-dimethyl-3,7-diazabicyclo[3.3.1]nonane-2,4,6,8-tetrone
- CAS Number: 107736-98-1
- PubChem CID: 65902
- ChemSpider: 59311
- UNII: FG0A3VRL5K
- CompTox Dashboard (EPA): DTXSID30869480

Chemical and physical data
- Formula: C_{28}H_{40}N_{4}O_{5}
- Molar mass: 512.651 g·mol^{−1}
- 3D model (JSmol): Interactive image
- SMILES: O=C1N(C(=O)C2C(=O)N(C(=O)C1C2(C)C)CCCCN4CCN(c3ccccc3OC)CC4)CCCC

Umespirone (KC-9172) is a drug of the azapirone class which possesses anxiolytic and antipsychotic properties. It behaves as a 5-HT_{1A} receptor partial agonist (K_{i} = 15 nM), D_{2} receptor partial agonist (K_{i} = 23 nM), and α_{1}-adrenoceptor receptor antagonist (K_{i} = 14 nM), and also has weak affinity for the sigma receptor (K_{i} = 558 nM). Unlike many other anxiolytics and antipsychotics, umespirone produces minimal sedation, cognitive/memory impairment, catalepsy, and extrapyramidal symptoms.

== Synthesis ==
Synthesis: Patent:

The condensation between ethyl cyanoacetate (1) and acetone gives ethylisopropylidenecyanoacetate [759-58-0] (2). This product is reacted with N-butylcyanoacetamide [39581-21-0] (3) in sodium methoxide solution to give N-butyl-2,4-dicyano-3,3-dimethylglutarimide, CID:10681941 (4). The glutarimide is cyclized with phosphoric acid to yield 3-butyl-9,9-dimethyl-3,7-diazabicyclo[3.3.1]nonane-2,4,6,8-tetraone, https://pubchem.ncbi.nlm.nih.gov/compound/10825633 CID:10825633 (5).

The reaction between 1-(o-anisyl)piperazine [35386-24-4] (6) and 1,4-dibromobutane [110-52-1] (7) gives the Quat salt CID:15895413(8).

Convergent synthesis (in the presence of potassium carbonate) affords Umespirone (KC-9172) (9).

== See also ==
- Azapirone
- List of investigational antipsychotics
