= Revospirone =

Chemical compound

Clinical data
- ATC code: none

Identifiers
- IUPAC name: 1,1-dioxo-2-[3-(4-pyrimidin-2-ylpiperazin-1-yl)propyl]-1,2-benzothiazol-3-one
- CAS Number: 95847-87-3
- PubChem CID: 72024
- ChemSpider: 65018
- UNII: 6X8764TW2J
- CompTox Dashboard (EPA): DTXSID10241982

Chemical and physical data
- Formula: C_{18}H_{21}N_{5}O_{3}S
- Molar mass: 387.46 g·mol^{−1}

Revospirone (Bay Vq 7813) is an azapirone drug which was patented as a veterinary tranquilizer but was never marketed. It acts as a selective 5-HT_{1A} receptor partial agonist. Similarly to other azapirones such as buspirone, revospirone produces 1-(2-pyrimidinyl)piperazine (1-PP) as an active metabolite. As a result, it also acts as an α_{2}-adrenergic receptor antagonist to an extent.
