= Azapirone =

Class of psychotropic drugs

Buspirone, the prototypical azapirone anxiolytic, which contains azaspirodecanedione and pyrimidinylpiperazine bound via a butyl chain.

Azapirones are a class of drugs used as anxiolytics, antidepressants, and antipsychotics. They are commonly used as add-ons to other antidepressants, such as selective serotonin reuptake inhibitors (SSRIs).

== List of azapirones ==
The azapirones include the following agents:

Anxiolytics

- Alnespirone (S-20,499)
- Binospirone (MDL-73,005)
- BMY-7,378 (CAS number: 21102-95-4 )
- Buspirone (Buspar)
- Enilospirone (CERM-3,726)
- Eptapirone (F-11,440)
- Gepirone (Exxua)
- Ipsapirone (TVX-Q-7,821)
- MJ-7378 (CAS number: 21103-03-7 )
- Revospirone (BAY-VQ-7,813)
- Tandospirone (Sediel)
- Zalospirone (WY-47,846)

Antipsychotics

- Perospirone (Lullan)
- Tiospirone (BMY-13,859)
- Umespirone (KC-9,172)

others

- SNAP-8719 (CAS number: 255893-38-0 )
- CID:14086451

== Medical uses ==
Azapirones have shown benefit in general anxiety and augmenting SSRIs in social anxiety and depression. Evidence is not clear for panic disorder and functional gastrointestinal disorders.

Tandospirone has also been used to augment antipsychotics in Japan as it improves cognitive and negative symptoms of schizophrenia. Buspirone is being investigated for this purpose as well.

== Side effects ==
Side effects of azapirones may include dizziness, headaches, restlessness, nausea, and diarrhea.

Azapirones have more tolerable adverse effects than many other available anxiolytics, such as benzodiazepines or SSRIs. Unlike benzodiazepines, azapirones lack abuse potential and are not addictive, do not cause cognitive/memory impairment or sedation, and do not appear to induce appreciable tolerance or physical dependence. However, azapirones are considered less effective with slow onset in controlling symptoms.

== Chemistry ==
Buspirone was originally classified as an azaspirodecanedione, shortened to azapirone or azaspirone due to the fact that its chemical structure contained this moiety, and other drugs with similar structures were labeled as such as well. However, despite all being called azapirones, not all of them actually contain the azapirodecanedione component, and most in fact do not or contain a variation of it. Additionally, many azapirones are also pyrimidinylpiperazines, though again this does not apply to them all.

Drugs classed as azapirones can be identified by their -spirone or -pirone suffix.

== Pharmacology ==
=== Pharmacodynamics ===
On a pharmacological level, azapirones varyingly possess activity at the following receptors:

- 5-HT_{1A} receptor (as partial or full agonists)
- 5-HT_{2A} receptor (as inverse agonists)
- D_{2} receptor (as antagonists or partial agonists)
- α_{1}-adrenergic receptor (as antagonists)
- α_{2}-adrenergic receptor (as antagonists)

Actions at D_{4}, 5-HT_{2C}, 5-HT_{7}, and sigma receptors have also been shown for some azapirones.

While some of the listed properties such as 5-HT_{2A} and D_{2} blockade may be useful in certain indications such as in the treatment of schizophrenia (as with perospirone and tiospirone), all of them except 5-HT_{1A} agonism are generally undesirable in anxiolytics and only contribute to side effects. As a result, further development has commenced to bring more selective of anxiolytic agents to the market. An example of this initiative is gepirone, which was recently approved after completing clinical trials in the United States for the treatment of major depression and generalized anxiety disorder. Another example is tandospirone which has been licensed in Japan for the treatment of anxiety and as an augmentation to antidepressants for depression.

5-HT_{1A} receptor partial agonists have demonstrated efficacy against depression in rodent studies and human clinical trials. Unfortunately, however, their efficacy is limited and they are only relatively mild antidepressants. Instead of being used as monotherapy treatments, they are more commonly employed as augmentations to serotonergic antidepressants like the SSRIs. It has been proposed that high intrinsic activity at 5-HT_{1A} postsynaptic receptors is necessary for maximal therapeutic benefits to come to prominence, and as a result, investigation has commenced in azapirones which act as 5-HT_{1A} receptor full agonists such as alnespirone and eptapirone. Indeed, in preclinical studies, eptapirone produces robust antidepressant effects which surpass those of even high doses of imipramine and paroxetine.

==== Comparison of binding profiles ====
Affinities of Azapirones for Neurotransmitter Binding Sites (K_{i}, nM)
Binding site	Buspirone	Gepirone	Ipsapirone	Tandospirone
5-HT_{1A}	20 ± 3	70 ± 10	7.9 ± 2	27 ± 5
5-HT_{1B}	> 100,000	> 100,000	> 100,000	> 100,000
5-HT_{1D}	> 100,000	> 100,000	33,000 ± 8,000	> 100,000
5-HT_{2A}	1,300 ± 400	3,000 ± 50	6,400 ± 4,000	1,300 ± 200
5-HT_{2C}	1,100 ± 200	5,000 ± 700	5,000 ± 1,000	2,600 ± 60
SERT	–	–	–	> 100,000
D_{1}	33,000 ± 1,000	> 100,000	15,000 ± 2,000	41,000 ± 10,000
D_{2}	240 ± 50	2,200 ± 200	1,900 ± 200	1,700 ± 300
α_{1}-Adrenergic	1,000 ± 400	2,300 ± 300	40 ± 7	1,600 ± 80
α_{2}-Adrenergic	6,000 ± 700	1,600 ± 200	1,900 ± 500	1,900 ± 400
β-Adrenergic	8,800 ± 1,000	> 100,000	> 100,000	> 100,000
mACh	38,000 ± 5,000	> 100,000	49,000 ± 5,000	> 100,000
GABA_{A}/BDZ	> 100,000	> 100,000	> 100,000	> 100,000

=== Pharmacokinetics ===
Azapirones are poorly but nonetheless appreciably absorbed and have a rapid onset of action, but have only very short half-lives ranging from 1–3 hours. As a result, they must be administered 2–3 times a day. The only exception to this rule is umespirone, which has a very long duration with a single dose lasting as long as 23 hours. Unfortunately, umespirone has not been commercialized. Although never commercially produced, Bristol-Myers Squibb applied for a patent on October 28, 1993, and received the patent on July 11, 1995, for an extended release formulation of buspirone. An extended release formulation of gepirone is currently under development and if approved, should help to improve this issue.

Metabolism of azapirones occurs in the liver and they are excreted in urine and feces. A common metabolite of several azapirones including buspirone, gepirone, ipsapirone, revospirone, and tandospirone is 1-(2-pyrimidinyl)piperazine (1-PP). 1-PP possesses 5-HT_{1A} partial agonist and α_{2}-adrenergic antagonist actions and likely contributes overall mostly to side effects.
