= Buspirone =

Medication used to treat anxiety disorders

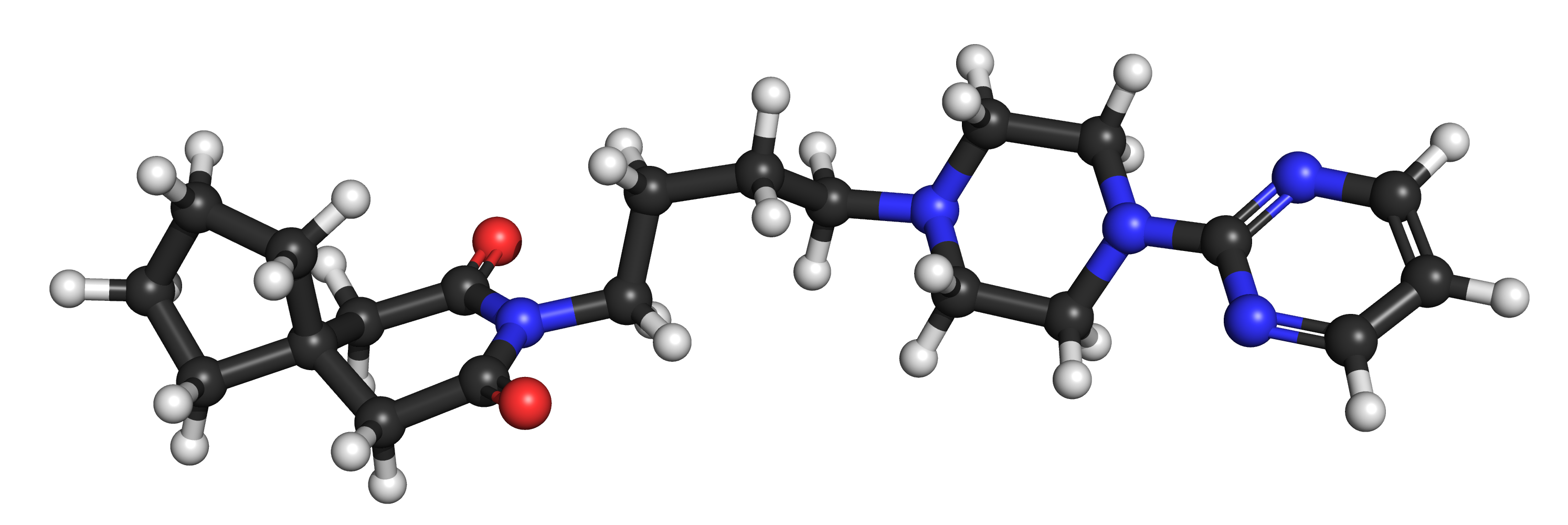

Clinical data
- Pronunciation: /ˈbjuːspɪroʊn/ (BEW-spi-rohn)
- Trade names: Buspar, others
- Other names: MJ 9022-1
- AHFS/Drugs.com: Monograph
- MedlinePlus: a688005
- License data: US DailyMed: Buspirone
- Pregnancy category: AU: B1
- Routes of administration: By mouth
- Drug class: Serotonin 5-HT_{1A} receptor partial agonist; Anxiolytic
- ATC code: N05BE01 (WHO)

Legal status
- Legal status: AU: S4 (Prescription only); BR: Class C1 (Other controlled substances); CA: ℞-only; UK: POM (Prescription only); US: ℞-only

Pharmacokinetic data
- Bioavailability: 3.9%
- Protein binding: 86–95%
- Metabolism: Liver (via CYP3A4)
- Metabolites: 5-OH-Buspirone; 6-OH-Buspirone; 8-OH-Buspirone; 1-PP
- Elimination half-life: 2.5 hours
- Excretion: Urine: 29–63% Feces: 18–38%

Identifiers
- IUPAC name: 8-{4-[4-(Pyrimidin-2-yl)piperazin-1-yl]butyl}-8-azaspiro[4.5]decane-7,9-dione
- CAS Number: 36505-84-7; as HCl: 33386-08-2
- PubChem CID: 2477
- IUPHAR/BPS: 36
- DrugBank: DB00490
- ChemSpider: 2383
- UNII: TK65WKS8HL
- KEGG: D07593
- ChEBI: CHEBI:3223
- ChEMBL: ChEMBL49
- CompTox Dashboard (EPA): DTXSID2022707
- ECHA InfoCard: 100.048.232

Chemical and physical data
- Formula: C_{21}H_{31}N_{5}O_{2}
- Molar mass: 385.512 g·mol^{−1}
- 3D model (JSmol): Interactive image
- SMILES: O=C1CC2(CCCC2)CC(=O)N1CCCCN1CCN(c2ncccn2)CC1
- InChI: InChI=1S/C21H31N5O2/c27-18-16-21(6-1-2-7-21)17-19(28)26(18)11-4-3-10-24-12-14-25(15-13-24)20-22-8-5-9-23-20/h5,8-9H,1-4,6-7,10-17H2; Key:QWCRAEMEVRGPNT-UHFFFAOYSA-N

Buspirone, sold under the name Buspar among others, is an anxiolytic medication primarily used for the treatment of generalized anxiety disorder. Unlike benzodiazepines, buspirone does not produce significant sedation, dependence, or withdrawal symptoms.

Buspirone's principal mechanism of action involves partial agonism at postsynaptic serotonin 5-HT_{1A} receptors and full agonism at presynaptic 5-HT_{1A} autoreceptors, which initially reduces serotonergic neuron firing. Over time, autoreceptor desensitization occurs, leading to increased serotonin release and enhanced serotonergic tone, which may contribute to its clinical efficacy. It has a delayed onset of action of 2–4 weeks. Buspirone also has weak antagonistic effects at dopamine D_{2}, D_{3}, and D_{4} receptors and α_{1}- and α_{2}-adrenergic receptors.

Buspirone is approved for the management of generalized anxiety disorder. It is sometimes used off-label for other anxiety disorders, as antidepressant augmentation in depression, for hypoactive sexual desire disorder in women, antidepressant-induced sexual dysfunction, and bruxism. Buspirone is not effective as a sedative–hypnotic or muscle relaxant and does not have anticonvulsant properties.

Common side effects of buspirone include nausea, headaches, dizziness, and difficulty concentrating. Serious side effects may include movement disorders, serotonin syndrome, and seizures. Its use in pregnancy appears to be safe but has not been well studied, and use during breastfeeding has not been well studied either.

Buspirone was developed in 1968 and approved for medical use in the United States in 1986. It is available as a generic medication. In 2023, it was the 40th most commonly prescribed medication in the United States, with more than 15 million prescriptions.

== Medical uses ==
=== Anxiety ===
Buspirone is used for the short-term and long-term treatment of anxiety disorders or symptoms of anxiety. It is typically as a second-line or augmentation therapy, notable for having a favorable side-effect profile and no risk of dependence.

Buspirone has no immediate anxiolytic effects, and hence has a delayed onset of action; its full clinical effectiveness may require 2–4 weeks to manifest itself. Buspirone is an effective and generally well-tolerated treatment for generalized anxiety disorder (GAD); evidence is limited by small sample size. Buspirone is associated with side effects like dizziness, constipation, and gastric distress; it also demonstrates cognitive benefits (especially in visual learning and memory, logical reasoning, and attention).

Buspirone is not known to be effective in the treatment of anxiety disorders other than GAD.

=== Other uses ===
==== Sexual dysfunction ====
There is some evidence that buspirone on its own may be useful in the treatment of hypoactive sexual desire disorder (HSDD) in women. Buspirone may also be effective in treating antidepressant-induced sexual dysfunction.

==== Miscellaneous ====
Buspirone is not effective as a treatment for benzodiazepine withdrawal, barbiturate withdrawal, or alcohol withdrawal.

SSRI and SNRI antidepressants such as paroxetine and venlafaxine, respectively, may cause jaw pain/jaw spasm reversible syndrome, although it is not common, and buspirone appears to be successful in treating antidepressant-induced bruxism.

== Contraindications ==
Buspirone has these contraindications:

- Hypersensitivity to buspirone
- Metabolic acidosis, as in diabetes
- Should not be used with MAO inhibitors
- Severely compromised liver or kidney function

== Side effects ==
Known side effects associated with buspirone include dizziness, headaches, nausea, tinnitus, and paresthesia. Buspirone is relatively well tolerated and is not associated with sedation, cognitive and psychomotor impairment, muscle relaxation, physical dependence, or anticonvulsant effects. In addition, buspirone does not produce euphoria and is not a drug of abuse.

Side effects of buspirone by incidence include:

Very common (>10% incidence)

- Dizziness/lightheadedness
- Headache
- Somnolence (sleepiness)

Common (1–10% incidence)

- Nervousness
- Insomnia
- Sleep disorder
- Disturbance in attention
- Depression
- Confusional state
- Anger
- Tachycardia (fast heart rate)
- Chest pain
- Sinusitis (nasal congestion)
- Pharyngolaryngeal pain
- Paraesthesia (tingling skin)
- Blurred vision
- Abnormal coordination
- Tremor
- Cold sweat
- Rash
- Nausea
- Abdominal pain
- Dry mouth
- Diarrhea
- Constipation
- Vomiting
- Fatigue
- Musculoskeletal pain

Other side effects have been noted with an incidence of 1% or less.

== Overdose ==
Buspirone appears to be relatively benign in cases of single-drug overdose, although no definitive data on this subject appear to be available. In one clinical trial, buspirone was administered to healthy male volunteers at a dosage of 375 mg/day, and produced side effects including nausea, vomiting, dizziness, drowsiness, miosis, and gastric distress. In early clinical trials, buspirone was given at dosages even as high as 2,400 mg/day, with akathisia, tremor, and muscle rigidity observed. Deliberate overdoses with 250 mg and up to 300 mg buspirone have resulted in drowsiness in about 50% of individuals. One death has been reported in a co-ingestion of 450 mg buspirone with alprazolam, diltiazem, alcohol, and cocaine.

== Interactions ==
Buspirone has been shown in vitro to be metabolized by the enzyme CYP3A4. This finding is consistent with the in vivo interactions observed between buspirone and these inhibitors or inducers of cytochrome P450 3A4 (CYP3A4), among others:

- Itraconazole: Increased plasma level of buspirone
- Rifampicin: Decreased plasma levels of buspirone
- Nefazodone: Increased plasma levels of buspirone
- Haloperidol: Increased plasma levels of buspirone
- Carbamazepine: Decreased plasma levels of buspirone
- Grapefruit: Significantly increases the plasma levels of buspirone. See grapefruit–drug interactions.
- Fluvoxamine: Moderately increased plasma levels of buspirone.

Elevated blood pressure has been reported when buspirone has been administered to patients taking monoamine oxidase inhibitors (MAOIs).

Buspirone has been found to markedly reduce the hallucinogenic effects of the serotonergic psychedelic psilocybin in humans. This parallels findings in which serotonin 5-HT_{1A} receptor agonists like 8-OH-DPAT attenuate the head-twitch response, a behavioral proxy of psychedelic effects, induced by serotonergic psychedelics in rodents. Paradoxically, however, buspirone enhances the head-twitch response, a behavioral proxy of psychedelic effects, induced by 5-hydroxytryptophan (5-HTP) plus pargyline in rodents.

== Pharmacology ==
=== Pharmacodynamics ===
Buspirone
Site	K_{i} (nM)	Action	Species	Ref
5-HT_{1A}	3.98–214; 21 (median)	Agonist	Human	
5-HT_{1B}	>100,000	Agonist ?	Rat	
5-HT_{1D}	22,000–42,700	Agonist ?	Human	
5-HT_{2A}	138–3,240	Antagonist	Human	
5-HT_{2B}	214	?	Human	
5-HT_{2C}	490	Antagonist ?	Human	
5-HT_{7}	375–381; 840	Antagonist ?	Rat; Human	
α_{1}	1,000	Antagonist	Rat	
α_{2}	6,000	Antagonist	Rat	
α_{2A}	7.3 (1-PP)	Antagonist	Human	
β	8,800	Antagonist	Rat	
D_{1}	33,000	Antagonist	Rat	
D_{2}	484; 240	Antagonist	Human; Rat	
D_{3}	98	Antagonist	Human	
D_{4}	29	Antagonist	Human	
mACh	38,000	?	Rat	
GABA_{A} (BDZ)	>100,000	-	Rat	
Values are K_{i} (nM). The smaller the value, the more strongly the drug interacts with the site.

Buspirone acts primarily on the serotonin 5-HT_{1A} receptor. It behaves as a full agonist at presynaptic 5-HT_{1A} autoreceptors in the dorsal raphe, reducing the firing of serotonin-producing neurons, and as a partial agonist at postsynaptic 5-HT_{1A} receptors in forebrain regions. This difference in activity between presynaptic and postsynaptic sites is thought to result from variations in receptor density and coupling efficiency.

Buspirone also has lower affinity for other serotonin receptors, including 5-HT_{2A}, 5-HT_{2B}, 5-HT_{2C}, 5-HT_{6}, and 5-HT_{7}, where it is thought to act primarily as an antagonist. In addition, buspirone has weak antagonistic activity at dopamine D_{2}, D_{3}, and D_{4} receptors, with preferential blockade of presynaptic D_{2} autoreceptors at low doses and postsynaptic D_{2} receptors only at higher doses.

A major metabolite of buspirone, 1-(2-pyrimidinyl)piperazine (1-PP), circulates at higher levels than buspirone itself and is a potent α_{2}-adrenergic receptor antagonist, which may contribute to some of buspirone's noradrenergic and dopaminergic effects. Buspirone has very weak affinity for α_{1}-adrenergic receptors, and does not interact with the GABA_{A} receptor.

Buspirone has been found to produce antiaggressive effects in rodents. It can strongly increase oxytocin levels in rodents, maximally by up to 9-fold. Conversely, the drug did not affect oxytocin levels in humans, though it enhanced hypoglycemia-induced oxytocin elevation.

=== Pharmacokinetics ===
Buspirone has a low oral bioavailability of 3.9% relative to intravenous injection due to extensive first-pass metabolism. The time to peak plasma levels following ingestion is 0.9 to 1.5 hours. It is reported to have an elimination half-life of 2.8 hours, although a review of 14 studies found that the mean terminal half-life ranged between 2 and 11 hours, and one study even reported a terminal half-life of 33 hours. Buspirone is metabolized primarily by CYP3A4, and prominent drug interactions with inhibitors and inducers of this enzyme have been observed. Major metabolites of buspirone include 5-hydroxybuspirone, 6-hydroxybuspirone, 8-hydroxybuspirone, and 1-PP. 6-Hydroxybuspirone has been identified as the predominant hepatic metabolite of buspirone, with plasma levels that are 40-fold greater than those of buspirone after oral administration of buspirone to humans. The metabolite is a high-affinity partial agonist of the 5-HT_{1A} receptor (K_{i}=25 nM) similarly to buspirone, and has demonstrated occupancy of the 5-HT_{1A} receptor in vivo. As such, it is likely to play an important role in the therapeutic effects of buspirone. 1-PP has also been found to circulate at higher levels than those of buspirone itself and may similarly play a significant role in the clinical effects of buspirone.

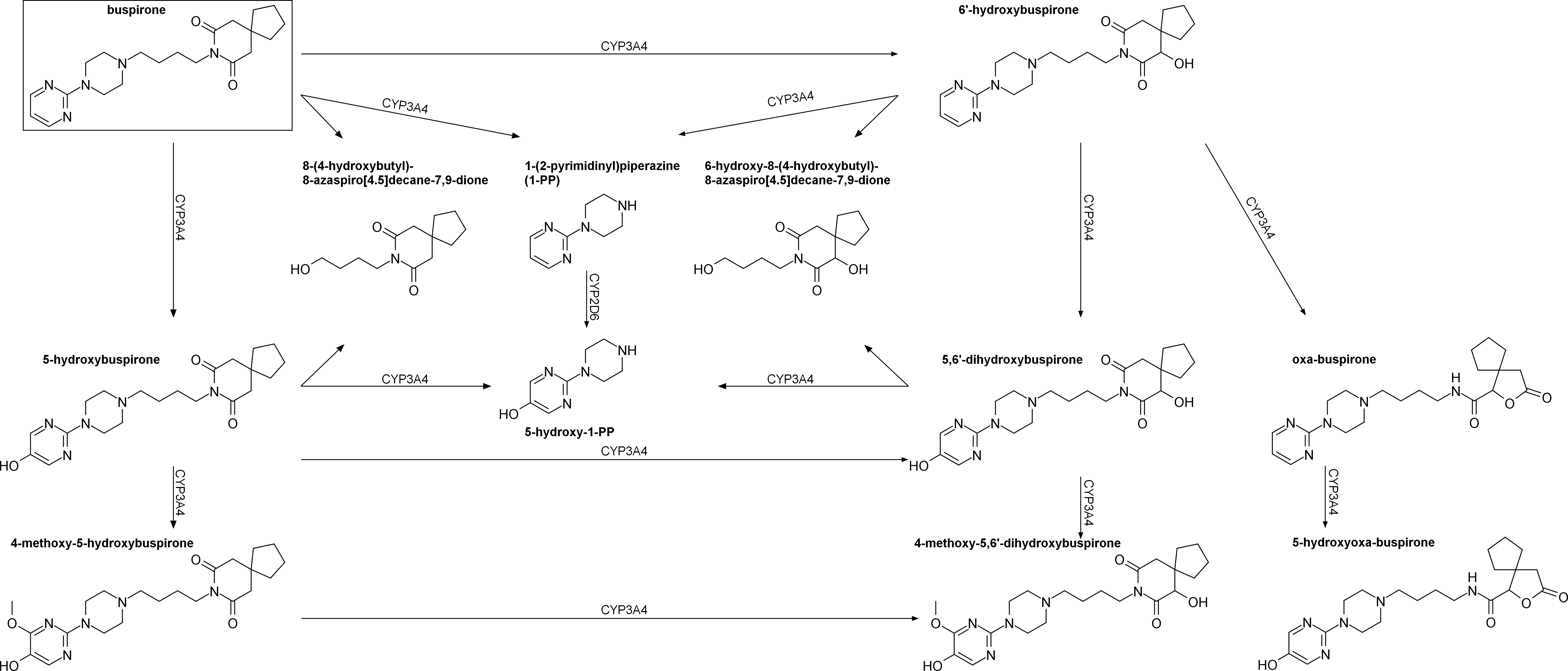
Phase I Metabolism of buspirone in humans

== Chemistry ==
Buspirone is a member of the azapirone chemical class, and consists of azaspirodecanedione and pyrimidinylpiperazine components linked together by a butyl chain.

=== Analogues ===
Structural analogues of buspirone include other azapirones like gepirone, ipsapirone, perospirone, and tandospirone.

A number of analogues are recorded.

=== Synthesis ===
A number of methods of synthesis have also been reported. One method begins with alkylation of 1-(2-pyrimidyl)piperazine (1) with 3-chloro-1-cyanopropane (4-chlorobutyronitrile) (2) to give (3). Next, reduction of the nitrile group is performed either by catalytic hydrogenation or with lithium aluminium hydride (LAH) giving (4). The primary amine is then reacted with 3,3-tetramethyleneglutaric anhydride (5) in order to yield buspirone (6).

Synthesis of buspirone

== History ==
Buspirone was first synthesized by a team at Mead Johnson in 1968 but was not patented until 1980. It was initially developed as an antipsychotic acting on the D_{2} receptor but was found to be ineffective in the treatment of psychosis; it was then used as an anxiolytic. In 1986, Bristol-Myers Squibb gained FDA approval for buspirone in the treatment of GAD. The patent expired in 2001, and buspirone is available as a generic drug.

== Society and culture ==
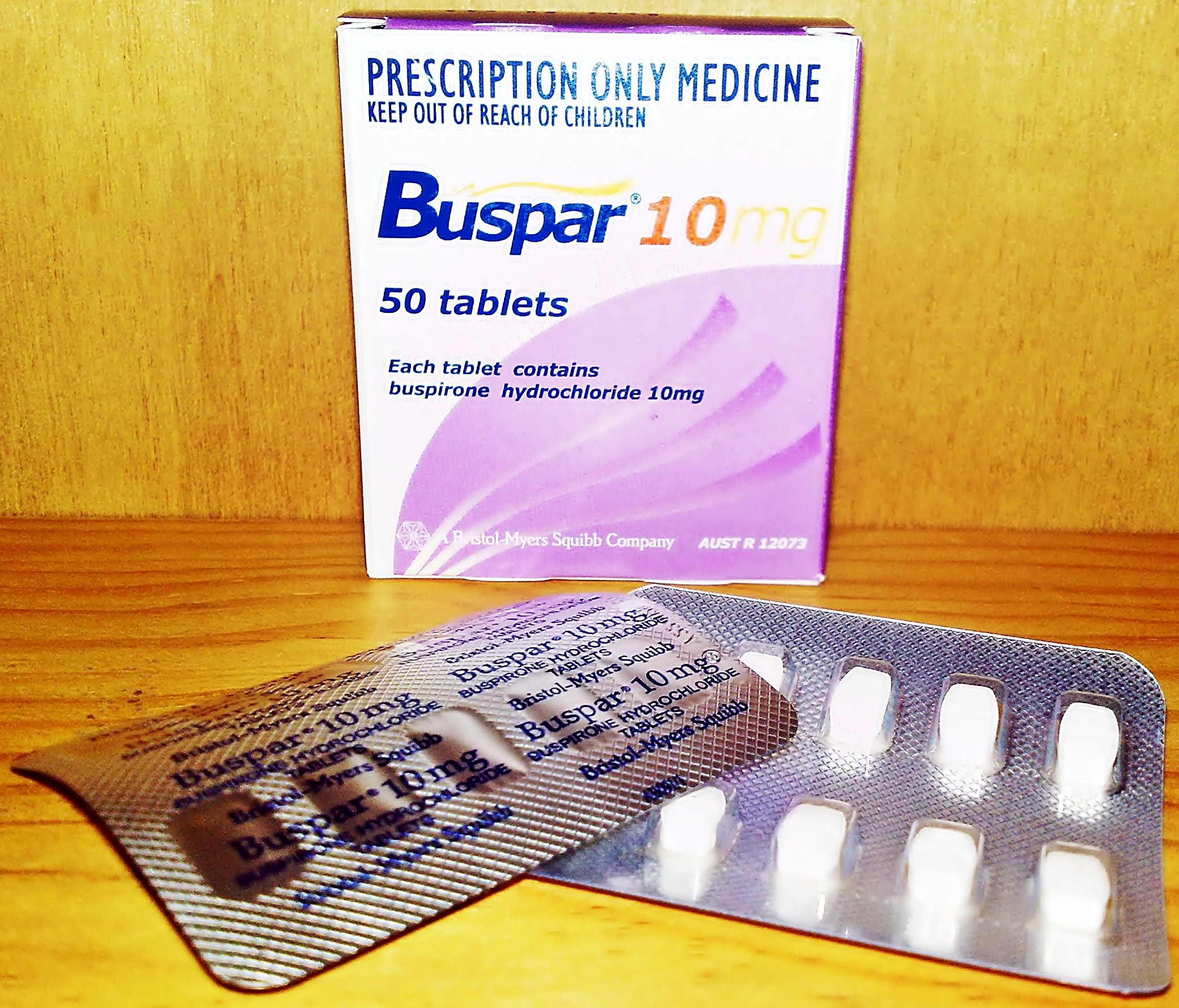
Buspar (buspirone) 10-mg tablets

=== Generic names ===
Buspirone is the INN, BAN, DCF, and DCIT of buspirone, while buspirone hydrochloride is its USAN, BANM, and JAN.

=== Brand names ===
Buspirone was primarily sold under the brand name Buspar. Buspar is currently listed as discontinued by the U.S. Food and Drug Administration (FDA). In 2010, in response to a citizen petition, the FDA determined that Buspar was not withdrawn from sale for reasons of safety or effectiveness.

== See also ==
- Buspirone/zolmitriptan
