= Tandospirone =

Anxiolytic and antidepressant medication

Clinical data
- Trade names: Sediel
- Other names: Metanopirone; SM-3997; SM3997
- AHFS/Drugs.com: International Drug Names
- Routes of administration: Oral
- Drug class: Serotonin 5-HT_{1A} receptor partial agonist; Anxiolytic; Antidepressant
- ATC code: None

Legal status
- Legal status: In general: ℞ (Prescription only)

Pharmacokinetic data
- Metabolites: 1-PP
- Elimination half-life: Tandospirone: 2–3 hours 1-PP: 3–5 hours
- Excretion: Urine (70%; 0.1% as unchanged drug)

Identifiers
- IUPAC name: (1R,2R,6S,7S)-4-{4-[4-(pyrimidin-2-yl)piperazin-1-yl]butyl}-4-azatricyclo[5.2.1.0^{2,6}]decane-3,5-dione
- CAS Number: 87760-53-0
- PubChem CID: 91273
- IUPHAR/BPS: 55
- ChemSpider: 82421
- UNII: 190230I669
- ChEBI: CHEBI:145673
- ChEMBL: ChEMBL274047
- CompTox Dashboard (EPA): DTXSID6048836
- ECHA InfoCard: 100.210.461

Chemical and physical data
- Formula: C_{21}H_{29}N_{5}O_{2}
- Molar mass: 383.496 g·mol^{−1}
- 3D model (JSmol): Interactive image
- SMILES: O=C1N(C(=O)[C@H]3[C@@H]1[C@@H]2CC[C@H]3C2)CCCCN5CCN(c4ncccn4)CC5
- InChI: InChI=1S/C21H29N5O2/c27-19-17-15-4-5-16(14-15)18(17)20(28)26(19)9-2-1-8-24-10-12-25(13-11-24)21-22-6-3-7-23-21/h3,6-7,15-18H,1-2,4-5,8-14H2/t15-,16+,17+,18-; Key:CEIJFEGBUDEYSX-FZDBZEDMSA-N

Tandospirone, sold under the brand name Sediel, is an anxiolytic and antidepressant medication used in Japan and China, where it is marketed by Dainippon Sumitomo Pharma. It is a member of the azapirone class of drugs and is closely related to other azapirones like buspirone and gepirone.

Tandospirone was introduced for medical use in Japan in 1996 and in China in 2004.

== Medical uses ==
=== Anxiety and depression ===
Tandospirone is most commonly used as a treatment for anxiety and depressive disorders, such as generalised anxiety disorder and dysthymia respectively. For both indications it usually takes a couple of weeks for therapeutic effects to begin to be seen, although at higher doses more rapid anxiolytic responses have been seen. It has also been used successfully as a treatment for bruxism.

=== Augmentation for depression ===
Tandospirone can be used as an effective augmentation, especially when coupled with fluoxetine or clomipramine.

=== Other uses ===
Tandospirone might been tried successfully as an adjunctive treatment for cognitive symptoms in schizophrenic individuals.

== Side effects ==
Common adverse effects include:

- Dizziness
- Drowsiness
- Insomnia
- Headache
- Gastrointestinal disorders
- Dry mouth
- Negative influence on explicit memory function
- Nausea

Adverse effects with unknown frequency include:

- Hypotension (low blood pressure)
- Dysphoria
- Tachycardia
- Malaise
- Psychomotor impairment

It is not believed to be addictive but is known to produce mild withdrawal effects (e.g., anorexia) after abrupt discontinuation.

== Pharmacology ==
=== Pharmacodynamics ===
Tandospirone acts as a potent and selective 5-HT_{1A} receptor partial agonist, with a K_{i} affinity value of 27 ± 5 nM and approximately 55 to 85% intrinsic activity. It has relatively weak affinity for the 5-HT_{2A} (1,300 ± 200), 5-HT_{2C} (2,600 ± 60), α_{1}-adrenergic (1,600 ± 80), α_{2}-adrenergic (1,900 ± 400), D_{1} (41,000 ± 10,000), and D_{2} (1,700 ± 300) receptors, and is essentially inactive at the 5-HT_{1B}, 5-HT_{1D}, β-adrenergic, and muscarinic acetylcholine receptors, serotonin transporter, and benzodiazepine allosteric site of the GABA_{A} receptor (all of which are > 100,000). There is evidence of tandospirone having low but significant antagonistic activity at the α_{2}-adrenergic receptor through its active metabolite 1-(2-pyrimidinyl)piperazine (1-PP). Tandospirone has been found to produce antiaggressive effects in rodents. It has been found to increase oxytocin levels in rodents.

== Chemistry ==
=== Synthesis ===
- The Noreximide [6319-06-8] precursor also has dual uses to make Taglutimide & Tripamide & Lurasidone.

Thieme Synthesis: Radiolabelled: Mannich reaction method:

The catalytic hydrogenation of cis-5-Norbornene-exo-2,3-dicarboxylic anhydride [129-64-6] (1) gives Norbornane-2exo,3exo-dicarboxylic Acid-anhydride [14166-28-0] (2). Reaction with aqueous ammonia leads to Exo-2,3-norbornanedicarboximide [14805-29-9] (3). Alkylation with 1,4-dibromobutane [110-52-1] (4) gives CID:10661911 (5). Alkylation of the remaining halogen with 2-(1-Piperazinyl)Pyrimidine [20980-22-7] (6) completed the synthesis of Tandospirone (7).

== History ==
Tandospirone was introduced in Japan for the treatment of anxiety disorders in 1996. It was subsequently also introduced in China in 2004.

== Society and culture ==
=== Name ===
Tandospirone is also known as metanopirone and by the developmental code name SM-3997. It is marketed in Japan under the brand name Sediel.
