= Azaspirodecane =

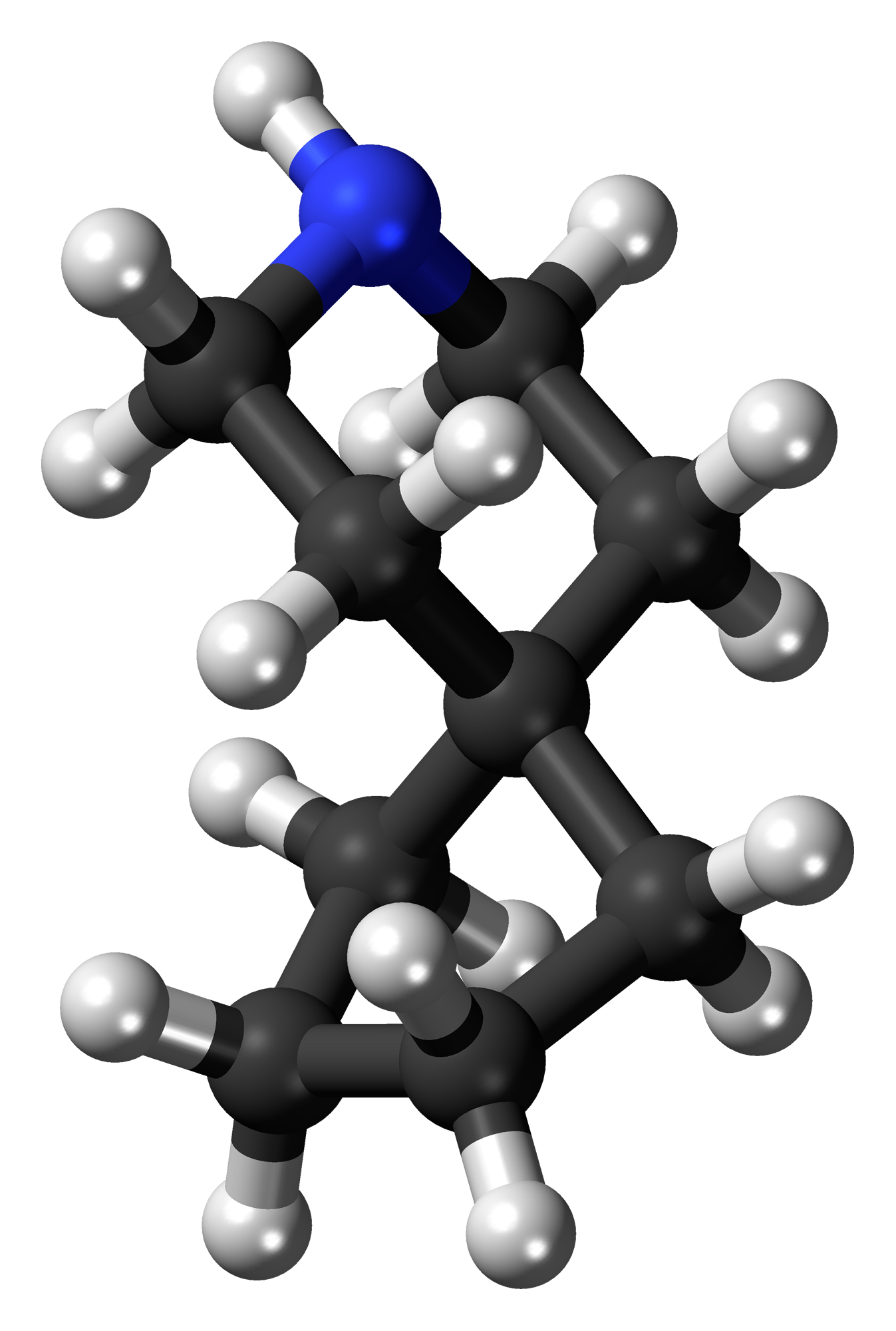

Names
- Preferred IUPAC name 8-Azaspiro[4.5]decane

Identifiers
CAS Number	176-64-7
3D model (JSmol)	Interactive image
ChemSpider	386671
PubChem CID	437152
UNII	6QKB8PR5XH
CompTox Dashboard (EPA)	DTXSID10331317
- InChI: InChI=1S/C9H17N/c1-2-4-9(3-1)5-7-10-8-6-9/h10H,1-8H2 Key: AXMNGEUJXLXFRY-UHFFFAOYSA-N; InChI=1S/C9H17N/c1-2-4-9(3-1)5-7-10-8-6-9/h10H,1-8H2
- SMILES: N2CCC1(CCCC1)CC2

Properties
Chemical formula	C_{9}H_{17}N
Molar mass	139.24 g/mol
- Except where otherwise noted, data are given for materials in their standard state (at 25 °C [77 °F], 100 kPa). verify (what is ?) Infobox references

Azaspirodecane is a chemical compound.

It is the core structure of the azaspirodecanedione moiety found in some of the azapirones.

== See also ==
- Amino acid
- Azaspirodecanedione
- Azapirone
- Azete
- Azetidine
- Cyanide
- Cyclobutadiene
- Melamine
- Purine
- Pyrimidine
