= Spirodecane =

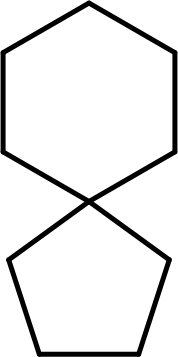

Names
- Preferred IUPAC name Spiro[4.5]decane

Identifiers
CAS Number	176-63-6
3D model (JSmol)	Interactive image
ChemSpider	119760
PubChem CID	135982
UNII	8Z5JKZ5PEM
CompTox Dashboard (EPA)	DTXSID40170059
- InChI: InChI=1S/C10H18/c1-2-6-10(7-3-1)8-4-5-9-10/h1-9H2
- SMILES: C2CCC1(CCCCC1)C2

Properties
Chemical formula	C_{10}H_{18}
Molar mass	138.25 g/mol
- Except where otherwise noted, data are given for materials in their standard state (at 25 °C [77 °F], 100 kPa). Infobox references

Spirodecane is a chemical compound. It features a cyclohexane ring bound directly to a cyclopentane ring. Different spirodecane sesquiterpenes have been produced in cultured mycelia by the fungus Cordyceps ophioglossoides.

Azaspirodecane is an analogue in which the cyclohexane group has been replaced with a piperidine.

== See also ==
- Azaspirodecane
