= Enilospirone =

Chemical compound

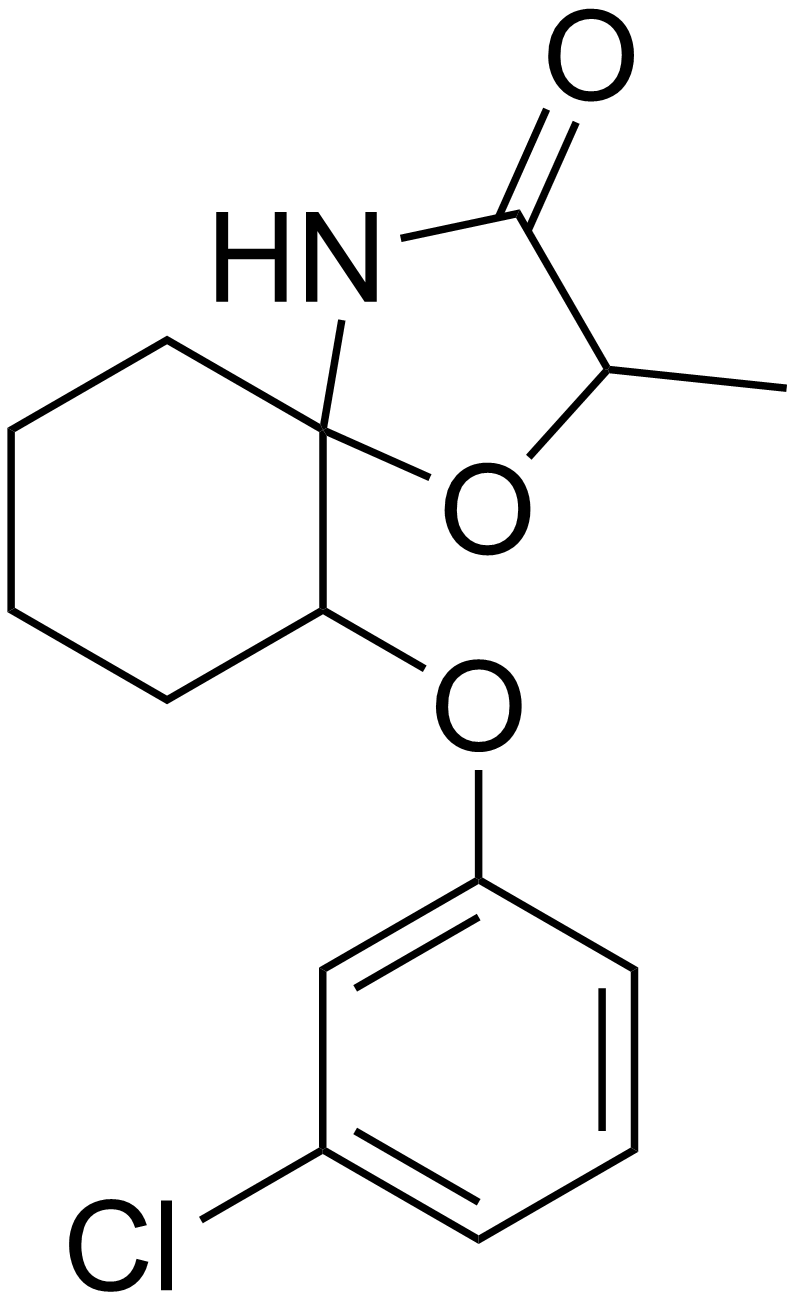

Clinical data
- Routes of administration: Oral
- ATC code: none

Legal status
- Legal status: In general: uncontrolled

Identifiers
- IUPAC name: 6-(3-chlorophenoxy)-2-methyl-1-oxa-4-azaspiro[4.5]decan-3-one
- CAS Number: 59798-73-1
- PubChem CID: 68794
- ChemSpider: 62034
- UNII: WO31V62797
- ECHA InfoCard: 100.056.284

Chemical and physical data
- Formula: C_{15}H_{18}ClNO_{3}
- Molar mass: 295.76 g·mol^{−1}

Enilospirone (CERM-3,726) is a selective 5-HT_{1A} receptor agonist of the azapirone class.

== See also ==
- Azapirone
