= Ipsapirone =

Antidepressant and anxiolytic drug

Clinical data
- Other names: BAY Q 7821; BAY-Q-7821; TVX Q 7821; TVX-Q-7821
- Routes of administration: Oral
- Drug class: Serotonin 5-HT_{1A} receptor partial agonist
- ATC code: None

Legal status
- Legal status: In general: uncontrolled

Pharmacokinetic data
- Metabolites: 1-(2-Pyrimidinyl)piperazine (1-PP) (2%)
- Elimination half-life: Ipsapirone: 1–3 hours 1-PP: 6.1 hours

Identifiers
- IUPAC name: 9,9-dioxo-8-[4-(4-pyrimidin-2-ylpiperazin-1-yl)butyl]- 9λ^{6}-thia-8-azabicyclo[4.3.0]nona-1,3,5-trien-7-one
- CAS Number: 95847-70-4
- PubChem CID: 56971
- IUPHAR/BPS: 42
- ChemSpider: 51365
- UNII: 6J9B11MN0K
- ChEMBL: ChEMBL8412
- CompTox Dashboard (EPA): DTXSID4045688

Chemical and physical data
- Formula: C_{19}H_{23}N_{5}O_{3}S
- Molar mass: 401.49 g·mol^{−1}
- 3D model (JSmol): Interactive image
- SMILES: O=C2c1ccccc1S(=O)(=O)N2CCCCN4CCN(c3ncccn3)CC4
- InChI: InChI=1S/C19H23N5O3S/c25-18-16-6-1-2-7-17(16)28(26,27)24(18)11-4-3-10-22-12-14-23(15-13-22)19-20-8-5-9-21-19/h1-2,5-9H,3-4,10-15H2; Key:TZJUVVIWVWFLCD-UHFFFAOYSA-N

Ipsapirone (INN, USAN, BAN; developmental code names BAY Q 7821 and TVX Q 7821) is a selective 5-HT_{1A} receptor partial agonist of the arylpiperazine and azapirone families which was under development for the treatment of major depressive disorder and anxiety disorders but was never marketed. It is taken orally.

The drug produces antidepressant-like, anxiolytic-like, and antiaggressive effects in rodents. It has been found to increase oxytocin levels in rodents, whereas findings in humans have been mixed. Ipsapirone produces adverse effects including vertigo, dizziness, and dysphoria in humans.

Ipsapirone produces 1-(2-pyrimidinyl)piperazine (1-PP), a potent α_{2}-adrenergic receptor antagonist, as an active metabolite. However, whereas 1-PP levels with buspirone are 8-fold higher than levels of buspirone itself, 1-PP is only a minor metabolite of ipsapirone constituting 2% of its exposure.

Ipsapirone was first described in the scientific literature by 1984. It was developed by Bayer. The drug reached phase 3 clinical trials for treatment of major depressive disorder prior to the discontinuation of its development in 1997. It was also studied for treatment of generalized anxiety disorder.

== See also ==
- Azapirone
- Buspirone
