= Zalospirone =

Chemical compound

Clinical data
- Routes of administration: Oral
- ATC code: none

Legal status
- Legal status: In general: uncontrolled

Pharmacokinetic data
- Elimination half-life: 1-4 hours

Identifiers
- IUPAC name: (3aα,4α,4aβ,6aβ,7α,7aα)-Hexahydro-2-(4-(4-(2-pyrimidinyl)-1-piperazinyl)butyl)-4,7-etheno-1H-cyclobut[f]isoindole-1,3(2H)-dione
- CAS Number: 114298-18-9
- PubChem CID: 163925
- IUPHAR/BPS: 58
- ChemSpider: 143768
- UNII: 0449O95Z1J
- CompTox Dashboard (EPA): DTXSID501028422

Chemical and physical data
- Formula: C_{24}H_{29}N_{5}O_{2}
- Molar mass: 419.529 g·mol^{−1}
- 3D model (JSmol): Interactive image
- SMILES: O=C1N(C(=O)[C@@H]4[C@H]1[C@@H]2\C=C/[C@H]4[C@H]3\C=C/[C@@H]23)CCCCN6CCN(c5ncccn5)CC6
- InChI: InChI=1S/C24H29N5O2/c30-22-20-18-6-7-19(17-5-4-16(17)18)21(20)23(31)29(22)11-2-1-10-27-12-14-28(15-13-27)24-25-8-3-9-26-24/h3-9,16-21H,1-2,10-15H2/t16-,17+,18-,19+,20-,21+; Key:AERLHOTUXIJQFV-RCPZPFRWSA-N

Zalospirone (WY-47,846) is a selective 5-HT_{1A} partial agonist of the azapirone chemical class. It was found to be effective in the treatment of anxiety and depression in clinical trials, but a high proportion of subjects dropped out due to side effects and development was subsequently never completed.

== See also ==
- Azapirone
