= Tiospirone =

Atypical antipsychotic drug

Clinical data
- ATC code: none

Legal status
- Legal status: Development terminated

Pharmacokinetic data
- Metabolism: Hepatic
- Elimination half-life: 1.4 hours
- Excretion: Urine

Identifiers
- IUPAC name: 8-[4-[4-(1,2-benzothiazol-3-yl)piperazin-1-yl]butyl]-8-azaspiro[4.5]decane-7,9-dione
- CAS Number: 87691-91-6
- PubChem CID: 55752
- IUPHAR/BPS: 101
- ChemSpider: 50348
- UNII: 35C6UMO5SR
- ChEMBL: ChEMBL35057
- CompTox Dashboard (EPA): DTXSID90236558

Chemical and physical data
- Formula: C_{24}H_{32}N_{4}O_{2}S
- Molar mass: 440.61 g·mol^{−1}

Tiospirone (BMY-13,859), also sometimes called tiaspirone or tiosperone, is an atypical antipsychotic of the azapirone class. It was investigated as a treatment for schizophrenia in the late 1980s and was found to have an effectiveness equivalent to those of typical antipsychotics in clinical trials but without causing extrapyramidal side effects. However, development was halted and it was not marketed. Perospirone, another azapirone derivative with antipsychotic properties, was synthesized and assayed several years after tiospirone. It was found to be both more potent and more selective in comparison and was commercialized instead.

== Pharmacology ==
=== Pharmacodynamics ===
Tiospirone acts as a 5-HT_{1A} receptor partial agonist, 5-HT_{2A}, 5-HT_{2C}, and 5-HT_{7} receptor inverse agonist, and D_{2}, D_{4}, and α_{1}-adrenergic receptor antagonist.

Binding profile

Receptor	K_{i} (nM)
5-HT_{2A}	0.06
5-HT_{2C}	9.73
5-HT_{6}	950
5-HT_{7}	0.64
M_{1}	630
M_{2}	180
M_{3}	1290
M_{4}	480
M_{5}	3900
D_{2}	0.5
D_{4}	13.6

== See also ==
- Azapirone
- List of investigational antipsychotics
