= Alnespirone =

Antidepressant and anxiolytic drug

Clinical data
- ATC code: none

Identifiers
- IUPAC name: (+)-4-dihydro-2H-chromen-3-yl]-propylamino]butyl]-8-azaspiro[4.5]decane-7,9-dione
- CAS Number: 138298-79-0
- PubChem CID: 178132
- ChemSpider: 8002134
- UNII: 34E28BM822
- ChEMBL: ChEMBL2104091
- CompTox Dashboard (EPA): DTXSID30160560

Chemical and physical data
- Formula: C_{26}H_{38}N_{2}O_{4}
- Molar mass: 442.600 g·mol^{−1}
- 3D model (JSmol): Interactive image
- SMILES: Cl.O=C1N(C(=O)CC2(C1)CCCC2)CCCCN([C@H]3Cc4c(OC)cccc4OC3)CCC
- InChI: InChI=1S/C26H38N2O4.ClH/c1-3-13-27(20-16-21-22(31-2)9-8-10-23(21)32-19-20)14-6-7-15-28-24(29)17-26(18-25(28)30)11-4-5-12-26;/h8-10,20H,3-7,11-19H2,1-2H3;1H/t20-;/m0./s1; Key:QYFHCFNBYQZGKW-BDQAORGHSA-N

Alnespirone (developmental code name S-20,499) is a selective 5-HT_{1A} receptor full agonist of the azapirone chemical class. It produces antidepressant, anxiolytic, and antiaggressive effects. It has been found to dose-dependently increase oxytocin levels in rodents.

== See also ==
- Azapirone
- 8-OH-DPAT
- 3-Aminochroman
