= Binospirone =

Anxiolytic drug

Clinical data
- ATC code: none

Identifiers
- IUPAC name: 8-[2-(2,3-dihydro-1,4-benzodioxin-2-ylmethylamino)ethyl]-8-azaspiro[4.5]decane-7,9-dione
- CAS Number: 102908-59-8; mesylate: 124756-23-6
- PubChem CID: 60769
- ChemSpider: 54766
- UNII: T3M5D109V5; mesylate: 155R3B9K8H
- ChEMBL: ChEMBL1487115
- CompTox Dashboard (EPA): DTXSID50861284

Chemical and physical data
- Formula: C_{20}H_{26}N_{2}O_{4}
- Molar mass: 358.438 g·mol^{−1}
- 3D model (JSmol): Interactive image
- SMILES: O=C1N(C(=O)CC2(C1)CCCC2)CCNCC3Oc4ccccc4OC3
- InChI: InChI=1S/C20H26N2O4/c23-18-11-20(7-3-4-8-20)12-19(24)22(18)10-9-21-13-15-14-25-16-5-1-2-6-17(16)26-15/h1-2,5-6,15,21H,3-4,7-14H2; Key:BVMYCHKQPGEOSI-UHFFFAOYSA-N

Binospirone (MDL-73,005-EF) is a drug which acts as a partial agonist at 5-HT_{1A} somatodendritic autoreceptors but as an antagonist at postsynaptic 5-HT_{1A} receptors. It has anxiolytic effects.

== See also ==
- Azapirone
