= Glutarimide =

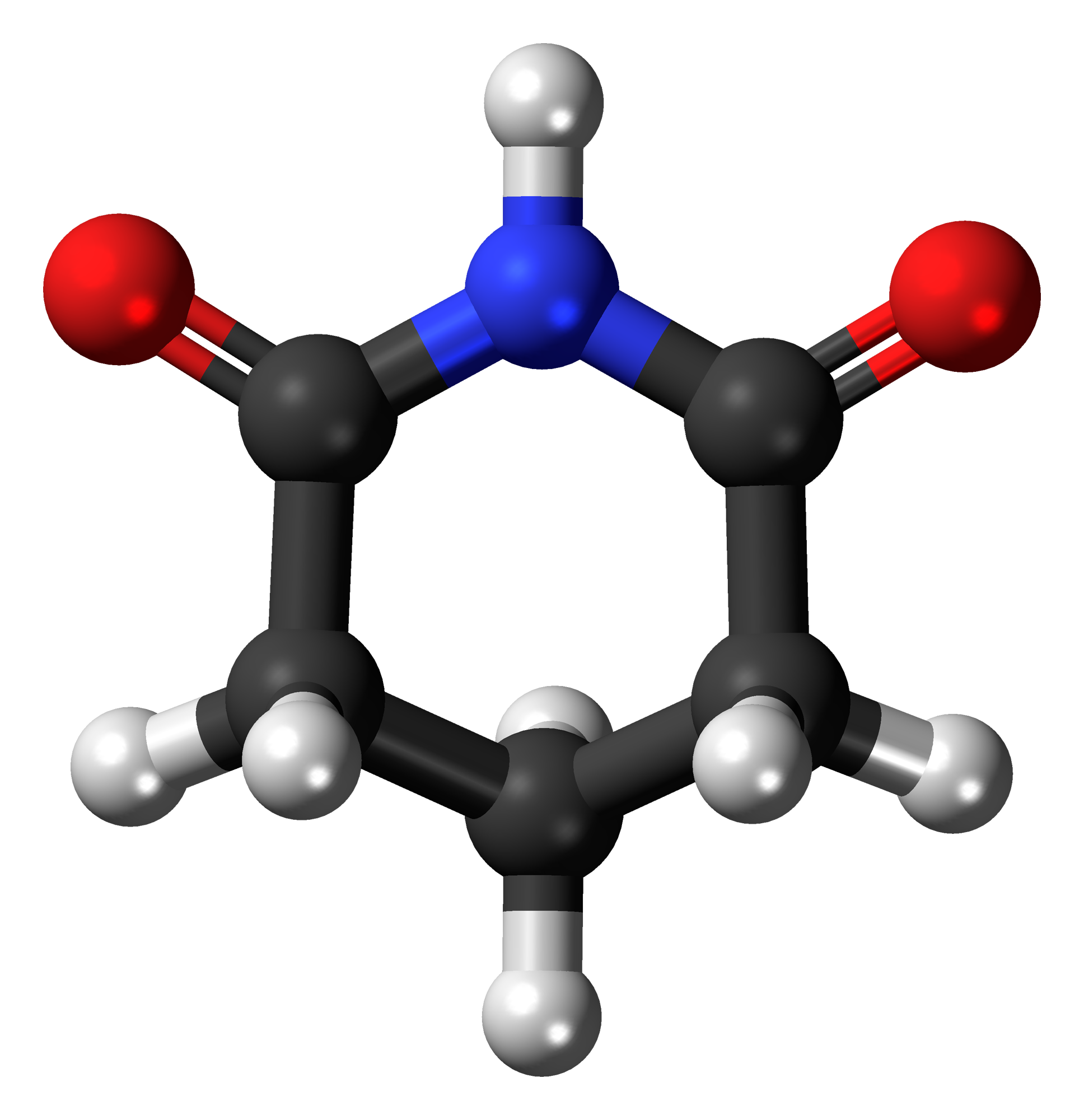

Names
- Preferred IUPAC name Piperidine-2,6-dione
- Other names 2,6-PiperidineDiketopiperidine dione; NSC 58190;

Identifiers
CAS Number	1121-89-7
3D model (JSmol)	Interactive image
ChemSpider	63891
ECHA InfoCard	100.013.038
EC Number	214-340-4
PubChem CID	70726
UNII	MV728O9612
CompTox Dashboard (EPA)	DTXSID7074452
- InChI: InChI=1S/C5H7NO2/c7-4-2-1-3-5(8)6-4/h1-3H2,(H,6,7,8) Key: KNCYXPMJDCCGSJ-UHFFFAOYSA-N
- SMILES: C1CC(=O)NC(=O)C1

Properties
Chemical formula	C_{5}H_{7}NO_{2}
Molar mass	113.116 g·mol^{−1}
Melting point	155–157 °C (311–315 °F; 428–430 K)
- Except where otherwise noted, data are given for materials in their standard state (at 25 °C [77 °F], 100 kPa). Infobox references

Glutarimide, also known by its chemical name 2,6-piperidinedione, is the organic compound with the formula (CH_{2})_{3}(CO)_{2}NH. It is a white solid compound that forms upon dehydration of the amide of glutaric acid.

The drug lenalidomide contains the substructure glutarimide (blue).
