= BMY-7378 =

Chemical compound

Identifiers
- IUPAC name: 8-(2-[4-(2-methoxyphenyl)-1-piperazinyl]ethyl)-8-azaspiro[4.5]decane-7,9-dione
- CAS Number: 21102-95-4
- PubChem CID: 2419
- IUPHAR/BPS: 9
- ChemSpider: 2325
- UNII: KC07KV8T5O
- ChEMBL: ChEMBL13647
- CompTox Dashboard (EPA): DTXSID70943430

Chemical and physical data
- Formula: C_{22}H_{31}N_{3}O_{3}
- Molar mass: 385.508 g·mol^{−1}
- 3D model (JSmol): Interactive image
- SMILES: C4CCCC4(CC1=O)CC(=O)N1CCN3CCN(CC3)c2ccccc2OC
- InChI: InChI=1S/C22H31N3O3/c1-28-19-7-3-2-6-18(19)24-13-10-23(11-14-24)12-15-25-20(26)16-22(17-21(25)27)8-4-5-9-22/h2-3,6-7H,4-5,8-17H2,1H3; Key:AYYCFGDXLUPJAQ-UHFFFAOYSA-N

BMY-7,378 is a 5-HT_{1A} receptor weak partial agonist/antagonist and α_{1D}-adrenergic receptor antagonist.
