= C21H24N2O4S =

The molecular formula C_{21}H_{24}N_{2}O_{4}S may refer to:

- Anaprazole
- Repinotan
