= Sarizotan =

Chemical compound

Clinical data
- Pregnancy category: N/A
- Routes of administration: Oral
- ATC code: none

Legal status
- Legal status: Discontinued

Identifiers
- IUPAC name: 1-[(2R)-3,4-dihydro-2H-chromen-2-yl]-N-([5-(4-fluorophenyl)pyridin-3-yl]methyl)methanamine
- CAS Number: 351862-32-3
- PubChem CID: 6918388
- ChemSpider: 2319847
- UNII: 467LU0UCUW
- CompTox Dashboard (EPA): DTXSID80956632

Chemical and physical data
- Formula: C_{22}H_{21}FN_{2}O
- Molar mass: 348.421 g·mol^{−1}
- 3D model (JSmol): Interactive image
- SMILES: C1CC2=CC=CC=C2O[C@H]1CNCC3=CN=CC(=C3)C4=CC=C(C=C4)F

Sarizotan (EMD-128,130) is a selective 5-HT_{1A} receptor agonist and D_{2} receptor antagonist, which has antipsychotic effects, and has also shown efficacy in reducing dyskinesias resulting from long-term anti-Parkinsonian treatment with levodopa.

In June 2006, the developer Merck KGaA announced that the development of sarizotan was discontinued, after two sarizotan Phase III studies (PADDY I, PADDY II) failed to meet the primary efficacy endpoint and neither the Phase II findings nor the results from preclinical studies could be confirmed. No statistically significant difference of the primary target variable between sarizotan and placebo could be demonstrated.

== See also ==
- Osemozotan
- Piclozotan
- Robalzotan
