= Osemozotan =

Pharmaceutical drug

Clinical data
- Other names: MKC-242; MKC242; MN-305; MN305
- Drug class: Serotonin 5-HT_{1A} receptor agonist
- ATC code: None

Legal status
- Legal status: In general: uncontrolled

Identifiers
- IUPAC name: 5-(3-[((2S)-1,4-benzodioxan-2-ylmethyl)amino]propoxy)-1,3-benzodioxole
- CAS Number: 137275-81-1; HCl: 137275-80-0
- PubChem CID: 198747
- DrugBank: DB05339
- ChemSpider: 172023
- UNII: M65825806Q; HCl: F0WKFYPQL8
- CompTox Dashboard (EPA): DTXSID00929762

Chemical and physical data
- Formula: C_{19}H_{21}NO_{5}
- Molar mass: 343.379 g·mol^{−1}
- 3D model (JSmol): Interactive image
- SMILES: C1[C@@H](OC2=CC=CC=C2O1)CNCCCOC3=CC4=C(C=C3)OCO4
- InChI: InChI=1S/C19H21NO5/c1-2-5-18-16(4-1)22-12-15(25-18)11-20-8-3-9-21-14-6-7-17-19(10-14)24-13-23-17/h1-2,4-7,10,15,20H,3,8-9,11-13H2/t15-/m0/s1; Key:MEEQBDCQPIZMLY-HNNXBMFYSA-N

Osemozotan (INN; developmental code names MKC-242 and MN-305) is a selective 5-HT_{1A} receptor agonist with some functional selectivity, acting as a full agonist at presynaptic and a partial agonist at postsynaptic 5-HT_{1A} receptors. 5-HT_{1A} receptor stimulation influences the release of various neurotransmitters including serotonin, dopamine, norepinephrine, and acetylcholine. 5-HT_{1A} receptors are inhibitory G protein-coupled receptor.

Osemozotan has been shown in animal studies to have antidepressant, anxiolytic, antiobsessional, serenic, and analgesic effects. It is used to investigate the role of 5-HT_{1A} receptors in modulating the release of dopamine and serotonin in the brain and their involvement in addiction to stimulants such as cocaine and methamphetamine.

== Pharmacology ==
=== Pharmacodynamics ===
Osemozotan acts as an agonist of the serotonin 5-HT_{1A} receptor. It binds with almost 1,000 times greater affinity for the 5-HT_{1A} receptor than for most other serotonin, dopamine, or adrenergic receptors. Even with repeated exposure of 5-HT_{1A} receptors to osemozotan, there is no change in the number of receptors, unlike with other pharmaceutical agonists.

It has been proposed that osemozotan could be used as an analgesic agent because of its activation of 5-HT_{1A} receptors associated with an inhibitory serotonin-signaling pathway within the spinal cord which causes hypoalgesia and decreasing mechanical allodynia. Osemozotan was found to decrease the incidence of fighting in mice similar to buspirone, diazepam, and tandospirone but required a lower pharmacologic dose to produce beneficial effects. Osemozotan showed dose-dependent anti-aggressive effects and was not shown to decrease motor coordination in the mice. When stimulated, 5-HT_{1A} receptors are shown to have anxiolytic and antidepressant pharmacologic effects.

OCD patients have been found to have increased 5-HT levels in the brain. With the use of osemozotan as a 5-HT_{1A} agonist, there is a decrease in serotonergic activity in the brain, leading to possible anti-obsessional pharmacological action. One animal mouse model used to test for OCD is known as the marble burying test, in which the amount of marbles buried within a certain time frame is recorded. Mice performed the marble burying test both with and without osemozotan. With osemozotan administration, the number of marbles buried was decreased with apparently little to no loss in motor coordination; these test results support the theory that osemozotan may be useful in the treatment of OCD.

It has been noted that sensitization to cocaine may stem from action of the 5-HT_{1A}receptor. While the role of 5-HT receptors with methamphetamine is still not certain, the use of osemozotan was found to decrease 5-HT levels in patients on repeated methamphetamine exposure; this may be a possibility for treatment of drug dependence with cocaine and methamphetamine.

=== Pharmacokinetics ===
Pharmacokinetic data collected from animal studies performed in mice and rats revealed an oral T_{max} of 15 minutes, an area under the curve of 2.943 mg·hr·L^{−1}, and an elimination half-life of 1.3 hours. Pharmacokinetic testing has been able to help explain the longer acting pharmacologic effects of osemozotan as well as its increased potency. Osemozotan was shown to have increased duration of pharmacologic effects compared to azapirones and requires a substantially lower dose to produce its pharmacologic effects. This result suggests that patients may not have to take the medication as often throughout the day. In these studies, there was a difference in dosage amount required for the intended indication. Osemozotan does not metabolize to 1-(2-pyrimidinyl)-piperazine (1-PP), a common metabolite found with the azapirone class of medications that has affinity for receptors other than the 5-HT_{1A} receptor, thus decreasing its specificity and increasing the risk of unwanted effects. Since osemozotan does not produce this metabolite, it has greater specificity toward the 5-HT_{1A} receptor when compared to other anxiolytic medications.

== Research ==
Osemozotan was under development for the treatment of anxiety disorders, generalized anxiety disorder, insomnia, irritable bowel syndrome, and major depressive disorder. It reached phase 2 clinical trials, but as of December 2025, development for all indications has been suspended, with suspension having occurred in May 2014. Besides the preceding indications, osemozotan has also been studied for potential treatment of pain, aggression, obsessive–compulsive disorder, and stimulant use disorder.

== See also ==
- Piclozotan
- Robalzotan
- Sarizotan
