= Repinotan =

Chemical compound

Clinical data
- Routes of administration: Oral

Legal status
- Legal status: In general: uncontrolled

Identifiers
- IUPAC name: (R)-(−)-2-[4-[(chroman-2-ylmethyl)-amino]-butyl]-1,1-dioxo-benzo[d]isothiazolone
- CAS Number: 144980-29-0
- PubChem CID: 198757
- IUPHAR/BPS: 95
- ChemSpider: 172029
- UNII: 05PB82Z52L
- ChEMBL: ChEMBL1614652
- CompTox Dashboard (EPA): DTXSID80162857

Chemical and physical data
- Formula: C_{21}H_{24}N_{2}O_{4}S
- Molar mass: 400.49 g·mol^{−1}
- 3D model (JSmol): Interactive image
- SMILES: C1CC2=CC=CC=C2O[C@H]1CNCCCCN3C(=O)C4=CC=CC=C4S3(=O)=O
- InChI: InChI=1S/C21H24N2O4S/c24-21-18-8-2-4-10-20(18)28(25,26)23(21)14-6-5-13-22-15-17-12-11-16-7-1-3-9-19(16)27-17/h1-4,7-10,17,22H,5-6,11-15H2/t17-/m1/s1; Key:YGYBFMRFXNDIPO-QGZVFWFLSA-N

Repinotan (BAYx3702), an aminomethylchroman derivative, is a selective 5-HT_{1A} receptor full agonist with high potency and efficacy. It has neuroprotective effects in animal studies, and was trialed in humans for reducing brain injury following head trauma. It was subsequently trialed up to phase II for treatment of stroke, but while side effects were mild and consisted mainly of nausea, repinotan failed to demonstrate sufficient efficacy to justify further clinical trials. However, repinotan continues to be investigated for other applications, and was found to be effective at counteracting the respiratory depression produced by morphine, though with slight reduction in analgesic effects.

== Medical uses ==
=== Acute ischemic stroke ===
Repinotan was originally developed by Bayer Healthcare AG (Wuppertal, Germany) as an oral treatment for depression. However, it was instead trialed as a candidate for reducing brain injury following head trauma. The drug was then examined as a preventative of secondary brain damage for ischemic stroke victims. Early trials showed repinotan's ability to reduce hippocampal CA1 and CA3 neuronal loss. Cortical tissue damage was also reduced. In addition, repinotan was shown to mitigate spatial learning deficits. However, trials were discontinued due to repinotan's efficacy being insufficient.

=== Respiratory depression ===
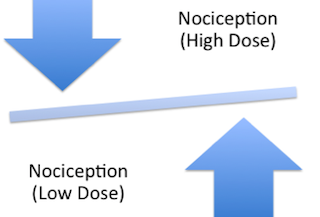
Repinotan Dose Relationship to Nociception

Repinotan has presently been found to be effective at stopping respiratory depression caused by morphine. In addition, it represses nociception at high doses, but enhances nociception at small doses (0.2 micrograms/kg). Repinotan may be applicable to Parkinson's disease, as it is able to reduce glutamate-induced excitotoxicity and thereby partially cell death.

=== Additional uses ===
Another stroke medication trialed at the same time, piclozotan, is similar to repinotan in that it is also a serotonin receptor agonist. Other drugs included zonampanel, which acts as an AMPA receptor antagonist instead of a 5-HT_{1A} receptor agonist and DP-b99. DP-b99 is a metal iron chelator.

== Side effects ==
Repinotan's side effects during trials as a treatment for ischemic stroke consisted mainly of serotonergic side effects including nausea and vomiting. The most common side effect was headache. Neurological worsening, cerebral hemorrhage, and brain edema were the most common severe effects. However, repinotan was generally shown to be safe.

Its current investigation as an antagonist for respiratory depression caused by morphine has shown there to be no serious cardiovascular side effects. However, a slight decrease in blood pressure was a more minor effect. Repinotan has been shown to induce miosis.

== Pharmacology ==
=== Pharmacodynamics ===
Repinotan HCI (BAYx3702) acts as a highly selective 5-HT_{1A} receptor full agonist. It is blocked by the specific 5-HT_{1A} receptor antagonist, WAY-100135.

Repinotan is believed to operate through neuronal hyperpolarization. When repinotan first binds to both pre- and postsynaptic 5-HT_{1A} receptors, G protein-coupled inwardly rectifying potassium channels (GIRKs) are activated. This leads to hyperpolarization, subsequent inhibition of neuron firing, and lowering of glutamate release, which allows neurons to be protected against overexcitation. This could explain repinotan's neuroprotective properties.

In addition, the protein Bcl-2, the serotonergic glial growth factor S100B, and nerve growth factor are affected by repinotan. Repinotan is able to suppress caspase-3 through MAPK and PKC alpha. Apoptosis as a result of anoxia/reoxygenation and H_{2}O_{2} treatment may also be inhibited.

Repinotan has been found to bind with high to moderate affinity to the alpha-1 and alpha-2 adrenergic, 5-HT_{7} and 5-HT_{1D}, dopamine D_{2} and D_{4}, sigma, and 5-HT_{2C} receptor. It is able to increase activity of VTA dopaminergic neurons and medial prefrontal cortex dopamine release.

It produces antiaggressive effects in rodents.

=== Pharmacokinetics ===
Repinotan's primary route of administration is by intravenous injection. It is able to cross the blood-brain barrier- a highly selective barrier that separates circulating blood from the brain's extracellular fluid. Diffusion acts as the driving force, which allows repinotan to cross in both directions. In addition, the drug is uncharged, which is consistent with the fact that it is able to pass the lipophilic and non-polar blood-brain barrier.

Infusion rates of up to 150 microg/h are well received. After infusion, the distribution equilibrium between plasma and brain is reached almost instantaneously. Repinotan's efficacy is mainly dependent on factors such as the length of time between the start of stroke symptoms and taking the drug. The age and blood pressure of the patient also plays a role. Decreases in response with increasing age as well as decreases in response as blood pressure increases are generally observed. The most efficient dose is approximately 1.25 mg per day.

The half-life of repinotan is approximately 1 hour. Elimination ensues in parallel from plasma and brain. In addition, repinotan's volume of distribution at steady-state and plasma clearance are independent of dose. This is indicative of linear pharmacokinetics over the range of 0.1-3.0 micrograms repinotan/kg/h.

its primary metabolizer is the CYP2D6 enzyme. Ethnic differences are known to have an effect on the rate of metabolism of the CYP2D6.

Sex and age do not have any influence on repinotan's pharmacokinetics. Bodyweight also does not play a big role.

== Chemistry ==
=== Properties ===
Repinotan is an enantiomerically pure aminomethyl chromane derivative with a saccharinylbutyl substituent. It is classified as a synthetic organic and possesses five hydrogen bond acceptors and one hydrogen bond donor. Its topological polar surface area is 84.09 and it has seven rotatable bonds. In addition, its molecular weight is 400.15 g/mole. Repinotan has a formal charge of zero and a covalently-bonded unit count of one. It is similar in chemical and physical properties to the ligands quetiapine, PAT5A, and pioglitazone.

=== Synthesis ===
Bayer Healthcare AG synthesized Repinotan in three main reaction sequences. A form with a metabolically stable ^{14}carbon-label was necessary for pharmacokinetic studies. The hydrochloride was hydroxylated in the 6-position of the chromane moiety.

For the first reaction sequence, [14C]-phenol was used as the starting compound. Michael adduct formation was then employed in the preparation of chromane rings with [14C]-phenol.

In the second reaction sequence, [Carbonyl-14C]-2-hydroxy-acetophenone was used first. Compound XII was formed from condensation of [carbonyl-14C-]-2-hydroxy-acetophenone with dimethyl oxylate and ring closure. Hydrogenolytical debenzylation and hydrochloric acid created the final product.

The third reaction involved intermediate XVII undergoing acylation using acetyl chloride. Deacetylation and debenzylation were then implemented with HCI. Pd/C was used in the deacetylation step and Pd/C was used in the debenzylation step.

Patent (Ex 92): Crystalline form: Radiolabelled: Revised:

The last step in the synthesis involves the reaction between (R)-2-aminomethylchroman [404337-71-9] (1) and N-(4-bromobutyl)saccharin [103564-59-6] (2).

== History ==
Bayer Healthcare AG (Wuppertal, Germany) first synthesized repinotan during early 2000s. As of 2004, it was expected to be filed by the NDA. Phase III trials for both ischemic stroke and traumatic brain injury were run in March 2002. However, these trials found the drug ineffective as a treatment (November, 2009).

In October 2010, further investigation showed repinotan able to counteract respiratory depression caused by morphine. Repinotan continues to be examined, but has not yet been commercially released.

Currently, repinotan is not commercially available in the United States. Sales of $1000 million in the U.S. and a launch date of 2006 were originally anticipated by Lehman Brothers. Bank Vontobel and Bayer both estimated sales of 450 million euros. However, the drug continues to be under investigation for different treatments than its original intent.

== See also ==
- Robalzotan
