= C23H27N3O2 =

The molecular formula C_{23}H_{27}N_{3}O_{2} (molar mass: 377.48 g/mol, exact mass: 377.2103 u) may refer to:

- CUMYL-THPINACA (SGT-42)
- GR-46611
- Morazone
- Quilostigmine
