= 3,4,5-Trimethoxyphenoxyethylamine =

Clinical data
- Other names: 2-(3,4,5-Trimethoxyphenoxy)ethylamine; 3,4,5-TMPhOEA

Identifiers
- IUPAC name: 2-(3,4,5-trimethoxyphenoxy)ethanamine
- CAS Number: 65876-17-7
- PubChem CID: 3028345
- ChemSpider: 2293772
- CompTox Dashboard (EPA): DTXSID60388654

Chemical and physical data
- Formula: C_{11}H_{17}NO_{4}
- Molar mass: 227.260 g·mol^{−1}
- 3D model (JSmol): Interactive image
- SMILES: COC1=CC(=CC(=C1OC)OC)OCCN
- InChI: InChI=1S/C11H17NO4/c1-13-9-6-8(16-5-4-12)7-10(14-2)11(9)15-3/h6-7H,4-5,12H2,1-3H3; Key:AFJZAAPPTLXGHC-UHFFFAOYSA-N

3,4,5-Trimethoxyphenoxyethylamine is a chemical compound of the phenoxyethylamine family related to the psychedelic phenethylamine mescaline. It is the analogue of mescaline in which an oxygen atom has been inserted between the benzene ring and the ethylamine side chain. The drug was tested in humans at doses of 10 to 300 mg orally but was found to be inactive. For comparison, mescaline is active at doses as low as 100 mg orally. 3,4,5-Trimethoxyphenoxyethylamine was first described and studied by A. Carlsson and colleagues in 1963. It was subsequently reviewed by Alexander Shulgin in his 1991 book PiHKAL (Phenethylamines I Have Known and Loved) and other publications.

== See also ==
- Phenoxyethylamine
- CT-4719
- CT-5126
- ORG-37684
