= Phenoxyethylamine =

Names
- IUPAC name 2-phenoxyethanamine
- Other names 2-Phenoxyethylamine

Identifiers
| CAS Number | 1758-46-9 |
| 3D model (JSmol) | Interactive image |
| ChEMBL | ChEMBL217680 |
| ChemSpider | 14886 |
| ECHA InfoCard | 100.015.594 |
| PubChem CID | 15651 |
| UNII | 8DGQ1B38R5 |
| CompTox Dashboard (EPA) | DTXSID30170028 |
- InChI: InChI=1S/C8H11NO/c9-6-7-10-8-4-2-1-3-5-8/h1-5H,6-7,9H2 Key: IMLAIXAZMVDRGA-UHFFFAOYSA-N
- SMILES: C1=CC=C(C=C1)OCCN

Properties
| Chemical formula | C_{8}H_{11}NO |
| Molar mass | 137.182 g·mol^{−1} |
- Except where otherwise noted, data are given for materials in their standard state (at 25 °C [77 °F], 100 kPa). Infobox references

Phenoxyethylamine, also known as 2-phenoxyethylamine, is a chemical compound related to phenethylamine (2-phenylethylamine). It is a parent compound of several psychedelic-related drugs including 3,4,5-trimethoxyphenoxyethylamine, CT-4719 (2,4-dichloro-5-methoxyphenoxyethylamine), CT-5126, and ORG-37684. It is also a parent compound of other drugs like the α-adrenergic receptor antagonist phenoxybenzamine, the α_{2}-adrenergic receptor modulators lofexidine, allyphenyline, and cyclomethyline, the β-adrenergic receptor agonists dextrofemine and isoxsuprine, the beta blocker carvedilol, the antihistamine phenyltoloxamine, the sodium channel blocker mexiletine, and the coronary vasodilator fenalcomine, among others.

There is a compound in the literature called 2,4-dichloro-6-phenoxyethyl-amine (aka DPEA or Lilly-32391 c.f. Lilly 18947). DPEA acts as a potent inhibitor of oxidative drug metabolism (e.g., microsomal demethylation and hydroxylation pathways) in a way similar to proadifen.

== See also ==
- Propanolamines
