= C19H27N3O3 =

The molecular formula C_{19}H_{27}N_{3}O_{3} (molar mass: 345.443 g/mol) may refer to:

- MDMB-BINACA
- MM-77
