= C22H26N4O2 =

The molecular formula C_{22}H_{26}N_{4}O_{2} (molar mass: 378.476 g/mol) may refer to:

- CSP-2503
- AZD3676
