= 5-MeO-DPAC =

Clinical data
- Other names: 5-Methoxy-3-(dipropylamino)chroman; 5-Methoxy-3-(di-n-propylamino)chroman; 5-Methoxy-3,4-dihydro-N,N-dipropyl-2H-1-benzopyran-3-amine
- Drug class: Serotonin 5-HT_{1A} receptor agonist
- ATC code: None

Legal status
- Legal status: Generally not controlled

Identifiers
- IUPAC name: 5-methoxy-N,N-dipropyl-3,4-dihydro-2H-chromen-3-amine
- CAS Number: 110927-00-9
- PubChem CID: 3082597
- ChemSpider: 2339997
- ChEMBL: ChEMBL283606
- CompTox Dashboard (EPA): DTXSID90911898

Chemical and physical data
- Formula: C_{16}H_{25}NO_{2}
- Molar mass: 263.381 g·mol^{−1}
- 3D model (JSmol): Interactive image
- SMILES: CCCN(CCC)C1CC2=C(C=CC=C2OC)OC1
- InChI: InChI=1S/C16H25NO2/c1-4-9-17(10-5-2)13-11-14-15(18-3)7-6-8-16(14)19-12-13/h6-8,13H,4-5,9-12H2,1-3H3; Key:GOWYIQOIWRLZLO-UHFFFAOYSA-N

5-MeO-DPAC, also known as 5-methoxy-3-(dipropylamino)chroman, is a potent and highly selective serotonin 5-HT_{1A} receptor full agonist related to 8-OH-DPAT. It is a derivative of 3-aminochroman, in which in the 5th position of the benzene ring there is a methoxy group, and in the 3rd position of dipropylamine.

The drug shows no affinity for other serotonin receptors or for the dopamine D_{2} receptor. It acts at very low concentrations, albeit with lower potency than 8-OH-DPAT, and unlike 8-OH-DPAT, does not bind to presynaptic serotonin 5-HT_{1A} receptors in the striatum.

The mechanism of action of 5-MeO-DPAC is to reduce the synthesis and turnover of serotonin in the brain through selective activation of serotonin 5-HT_{1A} autoreceptors, which is mediated through a negative feedback system without a direct effect on striatal binding sites.

Several analogues and positional isomers of 5-MeO-DPAC have also been described.

5-MeO-DPAC was first described in the scientific literature by 1987.

== See also ==
- 3-Aminochroman
- 8-OH-DPAT
- CT-5126
- Robalzotan
