= NBUMP =

Chemical compound

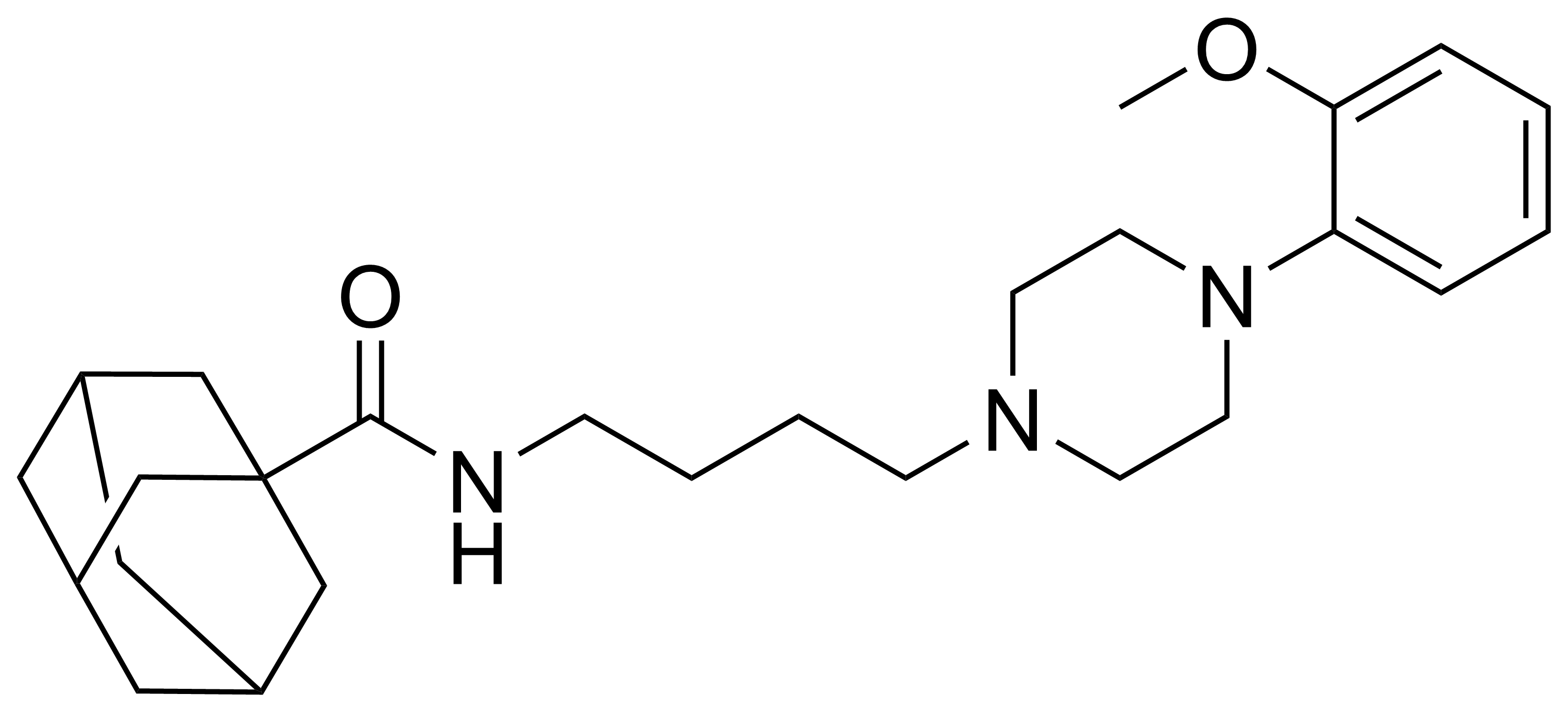

Clinical data
- ATC code: none

Identifiers
- IUPAC name: N-[4-[4-(2-methoxyphenyl)piperazin-1-yl]butyl]adamantane-1-carboxamide
- CAS Number: 134390-72-0
- PubChem CID: 64622
- ChemSpider: 58183
- UNII: G184WXO36J
- CompTox Dashboard (EPA): DTXSID901029353

Chemical and physical data
- Formula: C_{26}H_{39}N_{3}O_{2}
- Molar mass: 425.617 g·mol^{−1}
- 3D model (JSmol): Interactive image
- SMILES: COc1ccccc1N2CCN(CC2)CCCCNC(=O)C34CC5CC(C3)CC(C5)C4
- InChI: InChI=1S/C26H39N3O2/c1-31-24-7-3-2-6-23(24)29-12-10-28(11-13-29)9-5-4-8-27-25(30)26-17-20-14-21(18-26)16-22(15-20)19-26/h2-3,6-7,20-22H,4-5,8-19H2,1H3,(H,27,30); Key:PRZPXKIXNNNNCD-UHFFFAOYSA-N

NBUMP is a highly selective 5-HT_{1A} receptor partial agonist (K_{i} = 0.1 nM; IA = 40%) with an arylpiperazine structure. It is one of the highest affinity ligands for the 5-HT_{1A} receptor known. It displays 460- and 260-fold selectivity for 5-HT_{1A} over the α_{1}-adrenergic and D_{2} receptors, respectively.

== See also ==
- Adatanserin
