= SL88.0338 =

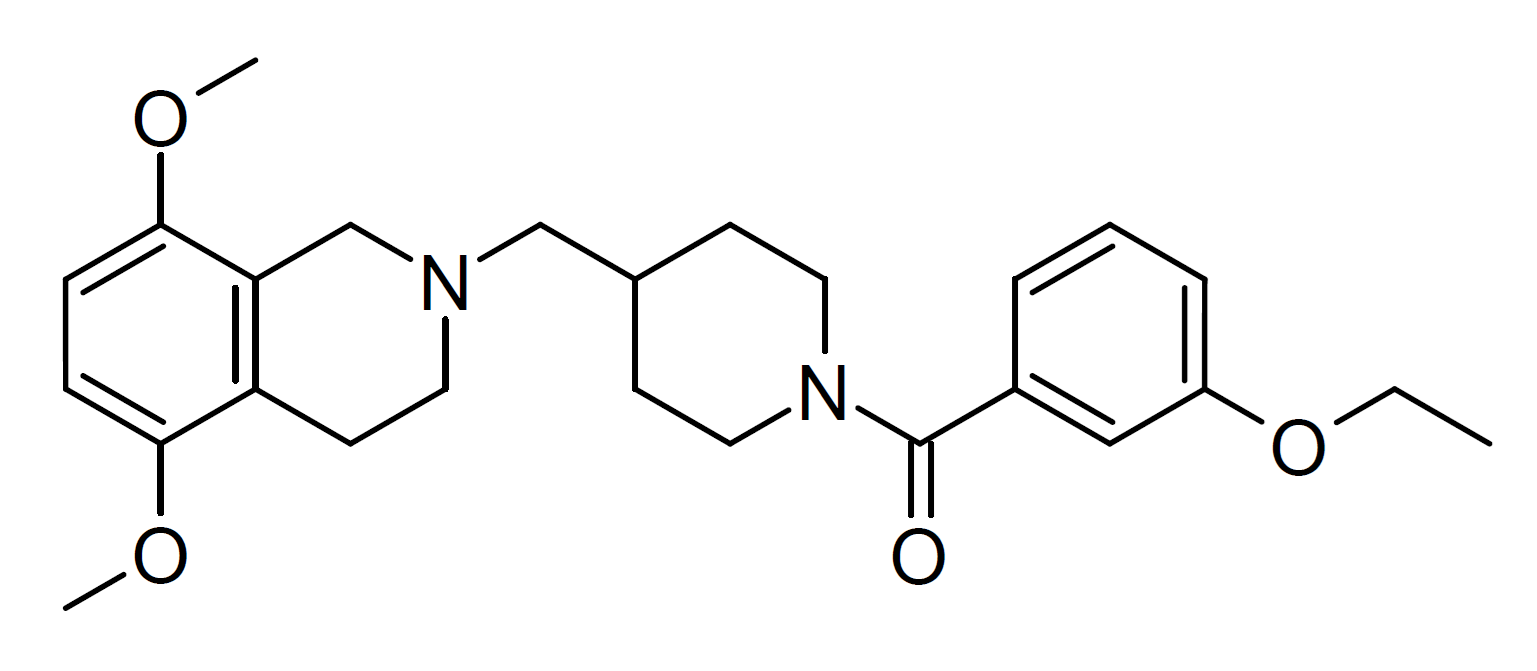

Clinical data
- Drug class: Serotonin 5-HT_{1A} receptor antagonist
- ATC code: None

Identifiers
- IUPAC name: [4-[(5,8-dimethoxy-3,4-dihydro-1H-isoquinolin-2-yl)methyl]piperidin-1-yl]-(3-ethoxyphenyl)methanone
- PubChem CID: 10455814
- ChemSpider: 8631230

Chemical and physical data
- Formula: C_{26}H_{34}N_{2}O_{4}
- Molar mass: 438.568 g·mol^{−1}
- 3D model (JSmol): Interactive image
- SMILES: CCOC1=CC=CC(=C1)C(=O)N2CCC(CC2)CN3CCC4=C(C=CC(=C4C3)OC)OC
- InChI: InChI=1S/C26H34N2O4/c1-4-32-21-7-5-6-20(16-21)26(29)28-14-10-19(11-15-28)17-27-13-12-22-23(18-27)25(31-3)9-8-24(22)30-2/h5-9,16,19H,4,10-15,17-18H2,1-3H3; Key:UUKBVYPABSDKFF-UHFFFAOYSA-N

SL88.0338 is a serotonergic drug with a benzoylpiperidine structure, which is used in scientific research. It acts as a potent and selective 5-HT_{1A} receptor antagonist. It is used for basic research into the action and behavioural effects of 5-HT_{1A} receptor activation and inactivation.

== See also ==
- GSK-958108
- SDZ-216-525
- WAY-100635
