= C24H33N3O2 =

The molecular formula C_{24}H_{33}N_{3}O_{2} (molar mass: 395.538 g/mol, exact mass: 395.2573 u) may refer to:

- LY-215,840
- WAY-100135
