= Lecozotan =

Chemical compound

Clinical data
- Other names: SRA-333; SRA333
- Drug class: Serotonin 5-HT_{1A} receptor antagonist
- ATC code: None

Identifiers
- IUPAC name: 4-Cyano-N-[(2R)-2-[4-(2,3-dihydro-1,4-benzodioxin-5-yl)-1-piperazinyl]propyl]-N-2-pyridinylbenzamide hydrochloride
- CAS Number: 434283-16-6
- PubChem CID: 10116877
- ChemSpider: 8292400
- UNII: 48854OTZ5E
- KEGG: D04683
- ChEMBL: ChEMBL372205
- CompTox Dashboard (EPA): DTXSID20195826

Chemical and physical data
- Formula: C_{28}H_{30}ClN_{5}O_{3}
- Molar mass: 520.03 g·mol^{−1}
- 3D model (JSmol): Interactive image
- SMILES: C[C@H](CN(C1=CC=CC=N1)C(=O)C2=CC=C(C=C2)C#N)N3CCN(CC3)C4=C5C(=CC=C4)OCCO5
- InChI: InChI=1S/C28H29N5O3/c1-21(31-13-15-32(16-14-31)24-5-4-6-25-27(24)36-18-17-35-25)20-33(26-7-2-3-12-30-26)28(34)23-10-8-22(19-29)9-11-23/h2-12,21H,13-18,20H2,1H3/t21-/m1/s1; Key:NRPQELCNMADTOZ-OAQYLSRUSA-N

Lecozotan (developmental code name SRA-333) is an investigational drug by Wyeth tested for improvement of cognitive functions of Alzheimer's disease patients. As of June 2008, the first Phase III clinical trial has been completed.

== Method of action ==
Lecozotan is a competitive, selective 5-HT_{1A} receptor antagonist which enhances the potassium-stimulated release of acetylcholine and glutamate.
