= DU-125530 =

Clinical data
- Other names: DU125530
- Drug class: Serotonin 5-HT_{1A} receptor antagonist
- ATC code: None

Identifiers
- IUPAC name: 2-[4-[4-(7-chloro-2,3-dihydro-1,4-benzodioxin-5-yl)piperazin-1-yl]butyl]-1,1-dioxo-1,2-benzothiazol-3-one
- CAS Number: 161611-99-0
- PubChem CID: 9848499
- UNII: ZB05V621UD

Chemical and physical data
- Formula: C_{23}H_{26}ClN_{3}O_{5}S
- Molar mass: 491.99 g·mol^{−1}
- 3D model (JSmol): Interactive image
- SMILES: C1CN(CCN1CCCCN2C(=O)C3=CC=CC=C3S2(=O)=O)C4=C5C(=CC(=C4)Cl)OCCO5
- InChI: InChI=1S/C23H26ClN3O5S/c24-17-15-19(22-20(16-17)31-13-14-32-22)26-11-9-25(10-12-26)7-3-4-8-27-23(28)18-5-1-2-6-21(18)33(27,29)30/h1-2,5-6,15-16H,3-4,7-14H2; Key:LYXKFNHUJJDTIA-UHFFFAOYSA-N

DU-125530 is a drug which acts as a potent and selective 5-HT_{1A} receptor antagonist. It has antidepressant effects in animal studies, as well as being used for basic research into the function of the 5-HT_{1A} receptor.

== See also ==
- GSK-958108
- SDZ-216-525
- WAY-100635
