= 3-Aminochroman =

Names
- IUPAC name 3,4-dihydro-2H-chromen-3-amine
- Other names: 3-aminochroman; 3-AH; DHABP

Identifiers
CAS Number	60575-19-1
3D model (JSmol)	Interactive image
ChemSpider	178226
PubChem CID	205709
CompTox Dashboard (EPA)	DTXSID20976011
- InChI: InChI=1S/C9H11NO/c10-8-5-7-3-1-2-4-9(7)11-6-8/h1-4,8H,5-6,10H2 Key: SVWDNDQOXZHBRM-UHFFFAOYSA-N
- SMILES: C1C(COC2=CC=CC=C21)N

Properties
Chemical formula	C_{9}H_{11}NO
Molar mass	149.193 g·mol^{−1}
- Except where otherwise noted, data are given for materials in their standard state (at 25 °C [77 °F], 100 kPa). Infobox references

3-Aminochroman (3-AC or 3-AH), also known as 3,4-dihydro-3-amino-2H-1-benzopyran (DHABP), is a chroman derivative, a hard cyclized amphetamine structural analogue, and a chemically important reagent in pharmaceutical synthesis; most derivatives of 3-aminochroman are powerful psychoactive substances, 3-aminochroman exhibits relatively moderate to low biological activity.

== Derivatives ==
- 3-Dipropylamino-5-hydroxychroman (5-OH-DPAC)
- Ebalzotan
- Robalzotan
- Alnespirone
- Aminochromanone
- DPAC
- 5-MeO-DPAC
- 6,7-Dihydroxy-3-aminochroman (6,7-diOH-3-AC)
- 8-OH-DPAC
- 6-OH-DPAC
- CT-5126

== See also ==
- Cyclized phenethylamine
- 2-Aminotetralin
- PD-128,907
