= Ebalzotan =

Chemical compound

Clinical data
- Other names: NAE-086; NAE086
- Routes of administration: Oral
- ATC code: None

Legal status
- Legal status: In general: uncontrolled

Identifiers
- IUPAC name: (3R)-N-(propan-2-yl)-3-[propan-2-yl(propyl)amino]-3,4-dihydro-2H-chromene-5-carboxamide
- CAS Number: 149494-37-1
- PubChem CID: 9797080
- ChemSpider: 7972846
- UNII: WV4B56N49H
- ChEMBL: ChEMBL1742470
- CompTox Dashboard (EPA): DTXSID601029378

Chemical and physical data
- Formula: C_{19}H_{30}N_{2}O_{2}
- Molar mass: 318.461 g·mol^{−1}
- 3D model (JSmol): Interactive image
- SMILES: O=C(NC(C)C)c2cccc1OC[C@H](N(C(C)C)CCC)Cc12
- InChI: InChI=1S/C19H30N2O2/c1-6-10-21(14(4)5)15-11-17-16(19(22)20-13(2)3)8-7-9-18(17)23-12-15/h7-9,13-15H,6,10-12H2,1-5H3,(H,20,22)/t15-/m1/s1; Key:UEAKCKJAKUFIQP-OAHLLOKOSA-N

Ebalzotan (developmental code name NAE-086) is a selective 5-HT_{1A} receptor agonist. It was under development as an antidepressant and anxiolytic agent but produced undesirable side effects in phase I clinical trials and was subsequently discontinued.

== See also ==
- 3-Aminochroman
- 4-HO-PiPT
- Robalzotan
