= Pindobind =

Names
- IUPAC name 2-Bromo-N-[4-(2-{[2-hydroxy-3-(1H-indol-4-yloxy)propyl]amino}-2-propanyl)-1-methylcyclohexyl]acetamide

Identifiers
CAS Number	106469-52-7
3D model (JSmol)	Interactive image
ChemSpider	4661
PubChem CID	4827
CompTox Dashboard (EPA)	DTXSID80910012
- InChI: InChI=1S/C23H34BrN3O3/c1-22(2,16-7-10-23(3,11-8-16)27-21(29)13-24)26-14-17(28)15-30-20-6-4-5-19-18(20)9-12-25-19/h4-6,9,12,16-17,25-26,28H,7-8,10-11,13-15H2,1-3H3,(H,27,29) Key: XSAGAZCYTLNCEN-UHFFFAOYSA-N; InChI=1/C23H34BrN3O3/c1-22(2,16-7-10-23(3,11-8-16)27-21(29)13-24)26-14-17(28)15-30-20-6-4-5-19-18(20)9-12-25-19/h4-6,9,12,16-17,25-26,28H,7-8,10-11,13-15H2,1-3H3,(H,27,29) Key: XSAGAZCYTLNCEN-UHFFFAOYAL
- SMILES: BrCC(=O)NC1(C)CCC(CC1)C(NCC(O)COc2cccc3c2cc[nH]3)(C)C

Properties
Chemical formula	C_{23}H_{34}BrN_{3}O_{3}
Molar mass	480.447 g·mol^{−1}
- Except where otherwise noted, data are given for materials in their standard state (at 25 °C [77 °F], 100 kPa). Infobox references

Pindobind is a compound developed by researchers associated with Stanford University, identified as a central nervous system depressant, which generated a response in animals reducing offensive actions such as chasing, while also notably reducing tendencies of the test animal to evade when stimulated to do so. It acts as an irreversible beta blocker and irreversible 5-HT_{1A} receptor antagonist.

== See also ==
- Pindolol
- Phenoxybenzamine
