= CT-4719 =

Clinical data
- Other names: CT4719; 2,4-Dichloro-5-methoxyphenoxyethylamine
- Drug class: Serotonergic psychedelic; Hallucinogen
- ATC code: None

Identifiers
- IUPAC name: 2-(2,4-dichloro-5-methoxyphenoxy)ethan-1-amine
- CAS Number: 23734-87-4
- ChemSpider: 75116116

Chemical and physical data
- Formula: C_{9}H_{11}Cl_{2}NO_{2}
- Molar mass: 236.09 g·mol^{−1}
- 3D model (JSmol): Interactive image
- SMILES: C(OC)1=C(Cl)C=C(Cl)C(OCCN([H])[H])=C1
- InChI: InChI=1S/C9H11Cl2NO2/c1-13-8-5-9(14-3-2-12)7(11)4-6(8)10/h4-5H,2-3,12H2,1H3; Key:HIWKOHHXTPAJAF-UHFFFAOYSA-N

CT-4719, also known as 2,4-dichloro-5-methoxyphenoxyethylamine, is a claimed hallucinogen related to psychedelic phenethylamines like mescaline. It is not technically a phenethylamine itself but is a close analogue of this family. The drug was reported to produce behavioral and electrocorticography (ECoG) effects very similar to but twice as potent as those of mescaline in cats. CT-4719 was first described in the scientific literature by 1969. Various related analogues, such as CT-5172 and CT-5126, have also been described. CT-4719 and related compounds were developed at the Laboratoire de Chimie Thérapeutique (CT; Therapeutic Chemistry Laboratory) of the Pasteur Institute in Paris, France.

An analogue of CT-4719 and of mescaline, 3,4,5-trimethoxyphenoxyethylamine, has also been described. It was inactive in terms of psychoactive effects in humans at doses of 10 to 300 mg.

== See also ==
- Phenoxyethylamine
- ORG-37684
