= NAN-190 =

Chemical compound

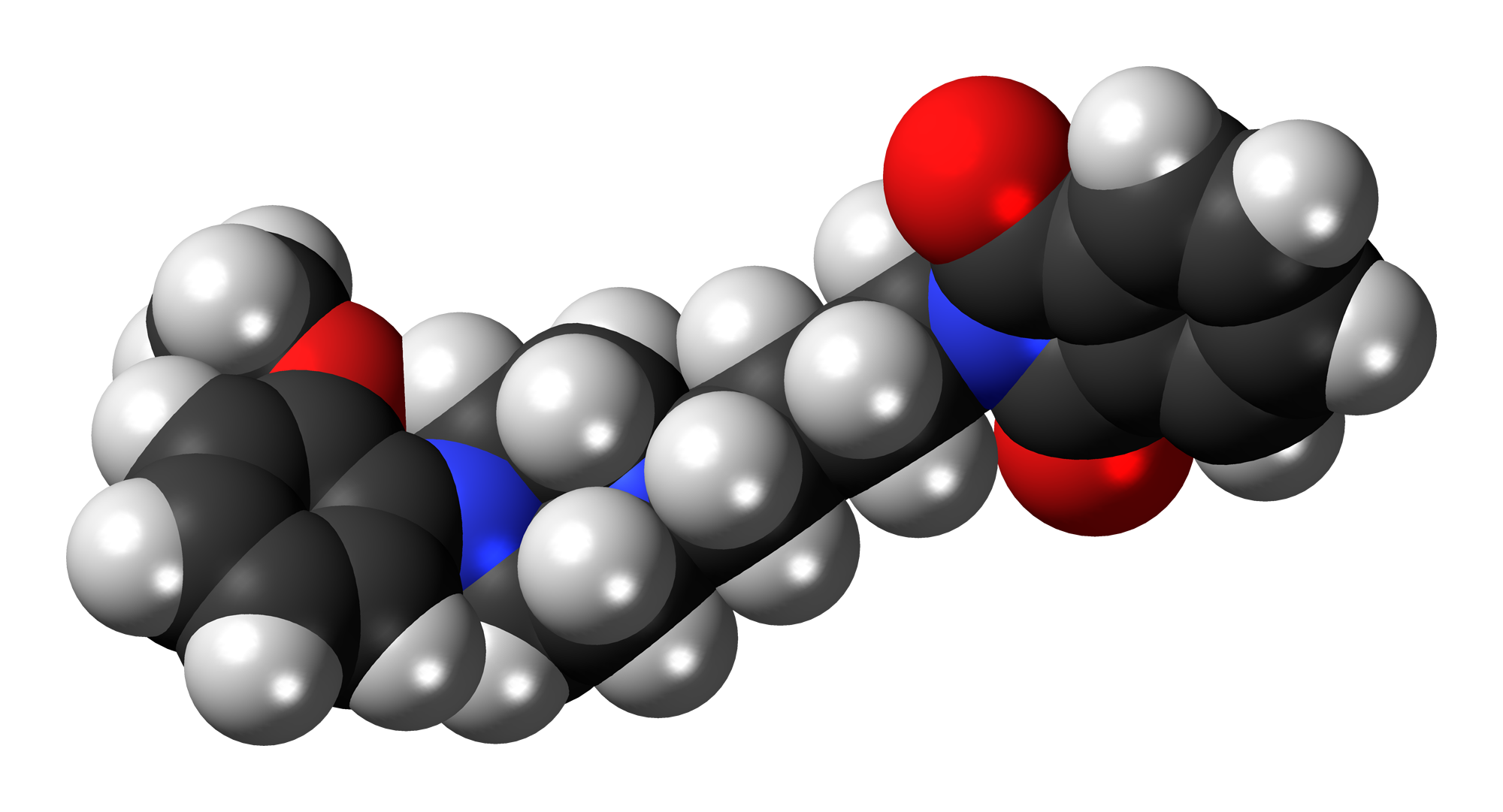

Identifiers
- IUPAC name: 1-(2-Methoxyphenyl)-4-(4-phthalimidobutyl)piperazine
- CAS Number: 102392-05-2 115388-32-4 (hydrobromide)
- PubChem CID: 4431
- IUPHAR/BPS: 73
- ChemSpider: 4278
- UNII: LQE19CTV54
- ChEMBL: ChEMBL8618
- CompTox Dashboard (EPA): DTXSID3043813

Chemical and physical data
- Formula: C_{23}H_{27}N_{3}O_{3}
- Molar mass: 393.487 g·mol^{−1}
- 3D model (JSmol): Interactive image
- SMILES: O=C1c2ccccc2C(=O)N1CCCCN4CCN(CC4)c3ccccc3OC
- InChI: InChI=1S/C23H27N3O3/c1-29-21-11-5-4-10-20(21)25-16-14-24(15-17-25)12-6-7-13-26-22(27)18-8-2-3-9-19(18)23(26)28/h2-5,8-11H,6-7,12-17H2,1H3; Key:SJDOMIRMMUGQQK-UHFFFAOYSA-N

NAN-190 is a drug and research chemical widely used in scientific studies. It was previously believed to act as a selective 5-HT_{1A} receptor antagonist, but a subsequent discovery showed that it also potently blocks the α_{2}-adrenergic receptor. The new finding has raised significant concerns about studies using NAN-190 as a specific serotonin receptor antagonist.
