= Rs6295 =

Genetic variation in the HTR1A gene

SNP: rs6295
- Name(s): C-1019G, C(-1019)G
- Gene: HTR1A
- Chromosome: 5
- Region: Promoter

External databases
- Ensembl: Human SNPView
- dbSNP: 6295
- HapMap: 6295
- SNPedia: 6295

rs6295, also called C(-1019)G, is a gene variation—a single nucleotide polymorphism (SNP)—in the HTR1A gene. It is one of the most investigated SNPs of its gene. The C-allele is the most prevalent with 0.675 against the G-allele with 0.325 among Caucasian.

The effect of the SNP on the binding potential of the human 5-HT_{1A} neuroreceptor has been assessed with positron emission tomography and the WAY-100635 radioligand, with a study reporting no apparent influence from the SNP.

== Disorders ==
The SNP has been investigated for association with suicide attempts, and psychiatric disorders. One study found an association of the variant with schizophrenia. Some studies associate the G-allele or GG-genotype with depression. Not all studies show associations between the disorder and the G-allele. In one study of premenstrual dysphoric disorder C/C was found as the high-risk genotype.

Several studies have examine the SNP association with medical treatment response, e.g., antidepressant response in mood disorders, e.g., one study reported worse response for G-allele patients.

== Personality ==
The polymorphism has also been investigated for links to personality traits. Persons with the G-allele of the polymorphism may have higher personality score for the NEO PI-R Neuroticism and TPQ Harm Avoidance traits. However, not all studies can find a clear association. One study has studied another trait and found higher score on Temperament and Character Inventory self-transcendence scale for G-allele subjects among mood disorder patients.

== Other SNPs ==
There are a number of other SNPs for the HTR1A gene: C549T, Ile28Val (rs1799921), Pro16Leu (rs1800041), Gly272Asp (rs1800042) and G294A (rs6294).
