= Phenoxybenzamine =

Alpha blocker medication

- Molecular structure of phenoxybenzamine

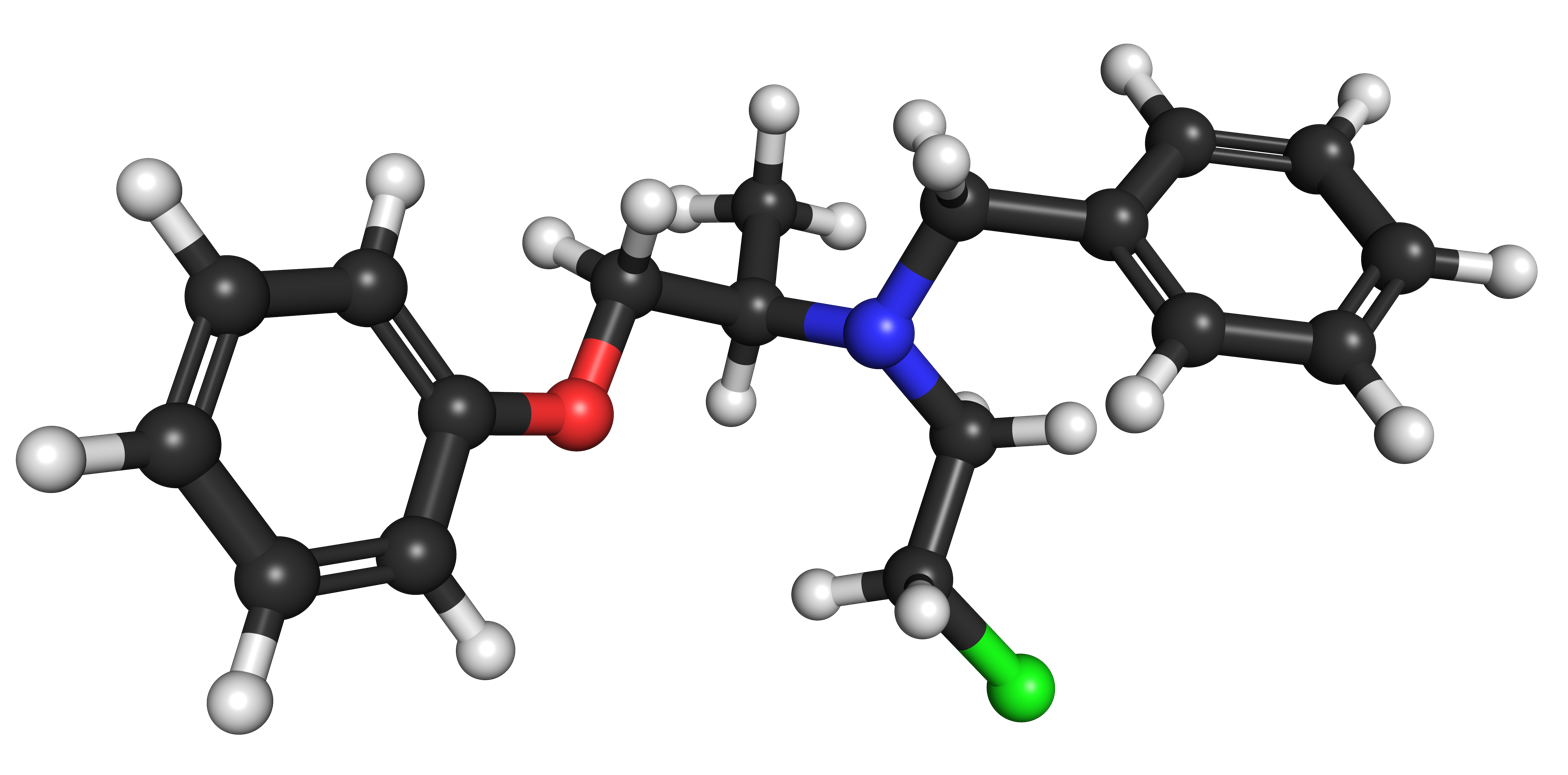
- 3D representation of a phenoxybenzamine molecule

Clinical data
- Trade names: Dibenzyline, Dibenyline
- AHFS/Drugs.com: Monograph
- MedlinePlus: a682059
- Pregnancy category: AU: B2
- Routes of administration: Oral
- Drug class: Non-selective alpha blocker
- ATC code: C04AX02 (WHO)

Pharmacokinetic data
- Elimination half-life: 24 hours

Identifiers
- IUPAC name: (RS)-N-Benzyl-N-(2-chloroethyl)-1-phenoxypropan-2-amine
- CAS Number: 59-96-1
- PubChem CID: 4768
- IUPHAR/BPS: 7268
- DrugBank: DB00925
- ChemSpider: 4604
- UNII: 0TTZ664R7Z
- KEGG: D08358
- ChEMBL: ChEMBL753
- CompTox Dashboard (EPA): DTXSID0023458
- ECHA InfoCard: 100.000.406

Chemical and physical data
- Formula: C_{18}H_{22}ClNO
- Molar mass: 303.83 g·mol^{−1}
- 3D model (JSmol): Interactive image
- Chirality: Racemic mixture
- SMILES: ClCCN(C(COc1ccccc1)C)Cc2ccccc2
- InChI: InChI=1S/C18H22ClNO/c1-16(15-21-18-10-6-3-7-11-18)20(13-12-19)14-17-8-4-2-5-9-17/h2-11,16H,12-15H2,1H3; Key:QZVCTJOXCFMACW-UHFFFAOYSA-N

Phenoxybenzamine, sold under the brand names Dibenzyline and Dibenyline, is a non-selective, irreversible alpha blocker.

== Medical uses ==
It is used in the treatment of hypertension, and specifically that caused by pheochromocytoma. It has a slower onset and a longer-lasting effect compared with other alpha blockers.

It was also the first alpha blocker to be used for treatment of benign prostatic hyperplasia, although it is currently seldom used for that indication due to unfavourable side effects.

It has been used in the treatment of hypoplastic left heart syndrome.

It is also used in complex regional pain syndrome (CRPS) type 1 due to its antiadrenergic effects. It has shown to be beneficial if used in the first 3 months of the CRPS diagnosis.

=== Investigational ===
Phenoxybenzamine has long been known to block ejaculation without affecting semen quality or ability to achieve orgasm, which could make it an effective male contraceptive. This effect is completely reversible, and is believed to be the result of alpha-1 adrenoceptor blockade in the longitudinal muscles of the vas deferens. A dose of 20 mg/day results in aspermia due to reversible paralyzing effects on the vas deferens, ampulla, and ejaculatory ducts. Due to these actions, phenoxybenzamine is also useful for the treatment of premature ejaculation in men.

== Pharmacology ==
Phenoxybenzamine is used as an anti-hypertensive due to its efficacy in reducing the vasoconstriction caused by adrenaline and noradrenaline. Phenoxybenzamine forms a permanent covalent bond with adrenergic receptors. Based on known information about the structures of these receptors, it likely involves attack by the cysteine at position 3.36 in transmembrane helix 3 to form a stable linkage. Thus, it remains permanently bound to the receptor, preventing adrenaline and noradrenaline from binding. This causes vasodilation in blood vessels, due to its antagonistic effect at the α_{1}-adrenergic receptor found in the walls of blood vessels, resulting in a drop in blood pressure. A side effect of phenoxybenzamine is reflex tachycardia.

As a non-selective alpha receptor antagonist, it will also affect both the postsynaptic α_{1}- and presynaptic α_{2}-adrenergic receptors in the nervous system, and so reduce sympathetic activity. This results in further vasodilation, pupil constriction, an increase in GI tract motility and secretions, and glycogen synthesis.

Non-selective alpha blockers are used as antihypertensives because they block alpha receptor-mediated vasoconstriction. The block on α_{2}-adrenergic receptors further potentiates beta receptor-effects, increasing cardiac output.

Phenoxybenzamine has a long-lasting action, binding covalently to the alpha receptors. Its only current clinical use is in preparing patients with pheochromocytoma for surgery; its irreversible antagonism and the resultant depression in the maximum of the agonist dose-response curve are desirable in a situation where surgical manipulation of the tumour may release a large bolus of pressor amine into the circulation. Typically, phenoxybenzamine is not used in the long term, as new receptors are made to upregulate alpha stimulation. The main limiting side effects of alpha blockers are that the baroreceptor reflex is disrupted and thus this can cause postural hypotension.

Phenoxybenzamine also has irreversible antagonist/weak partial agonist properties at the serotonin 5-HT_{2A} receptor. Due to its 5-HT_{2A} receptor antagonism, phenoxybenzamine is useful in the treatment of carcinoid tumor, a neoplasm that secretes large amounts of serotonin and causes diarrhea, bronchoconstriction, and flushing.

== Stereoisomerism ==
Phenoxybenzamine contains a stereocenter, so there are two enantiomers, the (R)- and the (S)-forms. All commercial preparations contain the drug as racemate.

Enantiomers of phenoxybenzamine
(R)-Phenoxybenzamine; CAS number: 71799-91-2	(S)-Phenoxybenzamine; CAS number: 71799-90-1

== See also ==
- Ketanserin
- Pindobind
- Phentolamine
- Phenoxyethylamine
