= CT-5172 =

Clinical data
- Other names: CT5172; 2,6-Dimethoxy-3,5-dichlorophenethylamine
- Drug class: Serotonergic psychedelic; Hallucinogen
- ATC code: None

Identifiers
- IUPAC name: 2-(2,6-dimethoxy-3,5-dichlorophenyl)ethanamine

Chemical and physical data
- Formula: C_{10}H_{13}Cl_{2}NO_{2}
- Molar mass: 250.12 g·mol^{−1}
- 3D model (JSmol): Interactive image
- SMILES: COC1C(Cl)=CC(Cl)=C(OC)C=1CCN([H])[H]
- InChI: InChI=1S/C10H13Cl2NO2/c1-14-9-6(3-4-13)10(15-2)8(12)5-7(9)11/h5H,3-4,13H2,1-2H3; Key:JROHWNOMPJKXNY-UHFFFAOYSA-N

CT-5172, also known as 2,6-dimethoxy-3,5-dichlorophenethylamine, is a claimed hallucinogen of the phenethylamine family. It is an analogue of the serotonergic psychedelics mescaline and the 2C series but with an unusual substitution pattern on the benzene ring that includes methoxy groups at the 2 and 6 positions and chlorine atoms at the 3 and 5 positions. The drug was reported to have significant but relatively weak mescaline-like effects in cats. CT-5172 was first described in the scientific literature by 1969. Various related analogues, such as CT-5126 and CT-4719, have also been described. CT-5172 and related compounds were developed at the Laboratoire de Chimie Thérapeutique (CT; Therapeutic Chemistry Laboratory) of the Pasteur Institute in Paris, France.

== See also ==
- Substituted methoxyphenethylamine
- Ψ-2C-T-4 (2,6-dimethoxy-4-isopropylthiophenethylamine)
- ψ-DOM (2,6-dimethoxy-4-methylamphetamine)
- TMA-6 (2,4,6-trimethoxyamphetamine)
- 2-Bromomescaline
- DODC (2,5-dimethoxy-3,4-dichloroamphetamine)
