= SDZ 216-525 =

Clinical data
- Other names: SDZ-216525; SDZ216525; SDZ216-525
- Drug class: Serotonin 5-HT_{1A} receptor antagonist
- ATC code: None

Identifiers
- IUPAC name: methyl 4-[4-[4-(1,1,3-trioxo-1,2-benzothiazol-2-yl)butyl]piperazin-1-yl]-1H-indole-2-carboxylate
- CAS Number: 141533-35-9
- PubChem CID: 3037456

Chemical and physical data
- Formula: C_{25}H_{28}N_{4}O_{5}S
- Molar mass: 496.58 g·mol^{−1}
- 3D model (JSmol): Interactive image
- SMILES: COC(=O)C1=CC2=C(N1)C=CC=C2N3CCN(CC3)CCCCN4C(=O)C5=CC=CC=C5S4(=O)=O
- InChI: InChI=1S/C25H28N4O5S/c1-34-25(31)21-17-19-20(26-21)8-6-9-22(19)28-15-13-27(14-16-28)11-4-5-12-29-24(30)18-7-2-3-10-23(18)35(29,32)33/h2-3,6-10,17,26H,4-5,11-16H2,1H3; Key:LPPRLWFUMJHAKF-UHFFFAOYSA-N

SDZ 216-525 is a serotonergic drug derived from the phenylpiperazine family which is used in scientific research. It acts as a potent and selective 5-HT_{1A} receptor antagonist, and is used for research into the function of the 5-HT_{1A} receptor.

== See also ==
- AZD3676
- DU-125530
- GSK-958108
- WAY-100635
