= MM-77 =

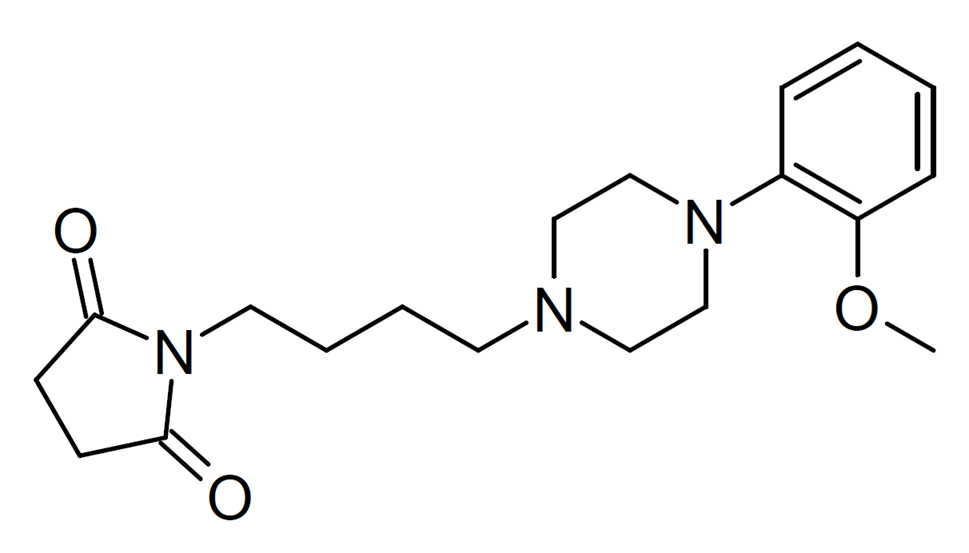

Clinical data
- Drug class: Serotonin 5-HT_{1A} receptor antagonist
- ATC code: None

Identifiers
- IUPAC name: 1-[4-[4-(2-methoxyphenyl)piperazin-1-yl]butyl]pyrrolidine-2,5-dione
- CAS Number: 159187-70-9
- PubChem CID: 3994476

Chemical and physical data
- Formula: C_{19}H_{27}N_{3}O_{3}
- Molar mass: 345.443 g·mol^{−1}
- 3D model (JSmol): Interactive image
- SMILES: COC1=CC=CC=C1N2CCN(CC2)CCCCN3C(=O)CCC3=O
- InChI: InChI=1S/C19H27N3O3/c1-25-17-7-3-2-6-16(17)21-14-12-20(13-15-21)10-4-5-11-22-18(23)8-9-19(22)24/h2-3,6-7H,4-5,8-15H2,1H3; Key:MQHOGPLXAXSQAJ-UHFFFAOYSA-N

MM-77 is a piperazine derivative which is a serotonergic drug, acting as a potent and selective 5-HT_{1A} receptor antagonist. It is used for research into the 5-HT_{1A} receptor and has anxiolytic effects in animal models.

== See also ==
- 2-Methoxyphenylpiperazine
- SL88.0338
- WAY-100635
