= Rs6294 =

Genetic variation in the HTR1A gene

SNP: rs6294
- Name(s): G294A
- Gene: HTR1A
- Chromosome: 5

External databases
- Ensembl: Human SNPView
- dbSNP: 6294
- HapMap: 6294
- SNPedia: 6294

Rs6294, also called G294A, is a gene variation—a single nucleotide polymorphism (SNP)— in the HTR1A gene.

C(-1019)G (rs6295) is another SNP in the HTR1A gene.
