= Lesopitron =

Chemical compound

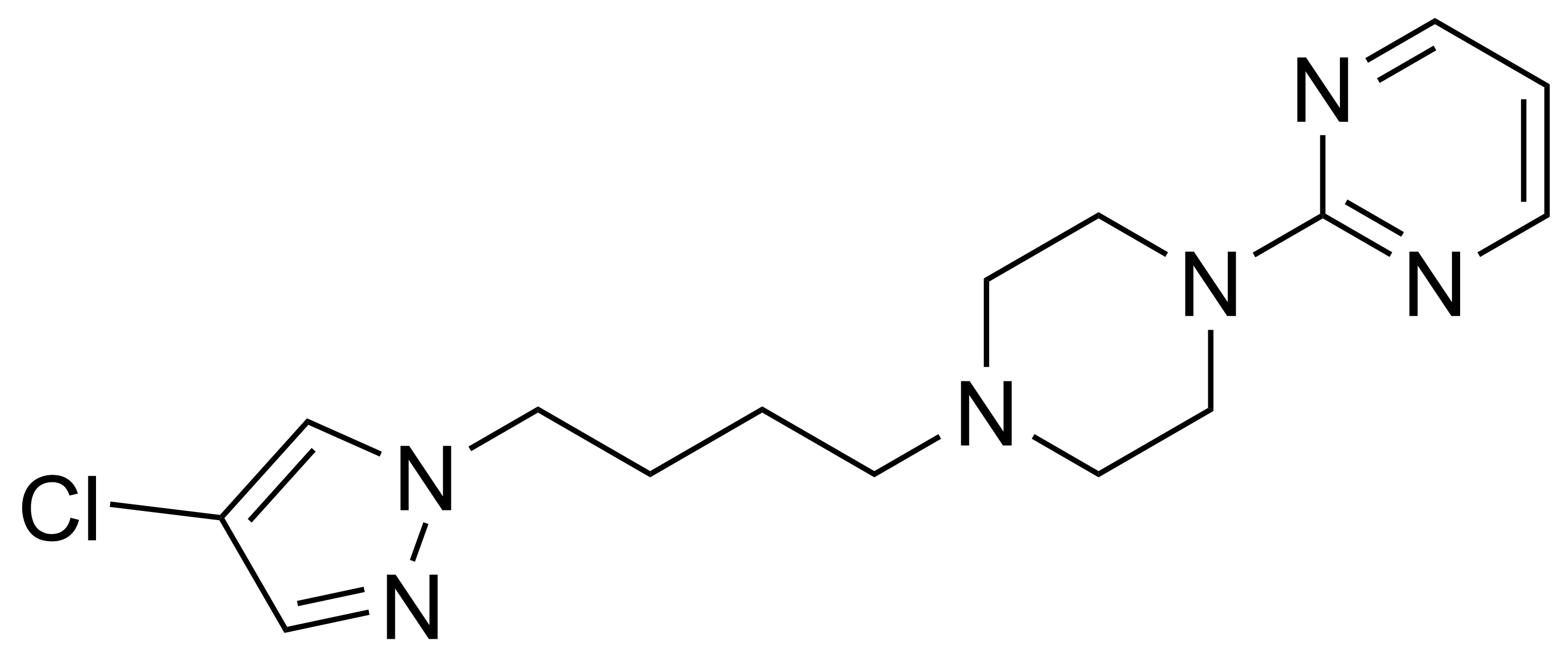

Clinical data
- Routes of administration: Oral
- ATC code: none

Legal status
- Legal status: In general: uncontrolled

Identifiers
- IUPAC name: 2-{4-[4-(4-chloro-1H-pyrazol-1-yl)butyl]piperazin-1-yl}pyrimidine
- CAS Number: 132449-46-8
- PubChem CID: 60813
- ChemSpider: 54801
- UNII: H1CGM4755H
- CompTox Dashboard (EPA): DTXSID40157587

Chemical and physical data
- Formula: C_{15}H_{21}ClN_{6}
- Molar mass: 320.83 g·mol^{−1}
- 3D model (JSmol): Interactive image
- SMILES: Clc1cn(nc1)CCCCN3CCN(c2ncccn2)CC3

Lesopitron (E-4424) is a selective full agonist of the 5-HT_{1A} receptor which is structurally related to the azapirones. In 2001 it was under development by Esteve as an anxiolytic for the treatment of generalized anxiety disorder (GAD). It made it to phase II clinical trials but was apparently discontinued as no new information on lesopitron has surfaced since.

== See also ==
- Sunepitron
