= Sunepitron =

Chemical compound

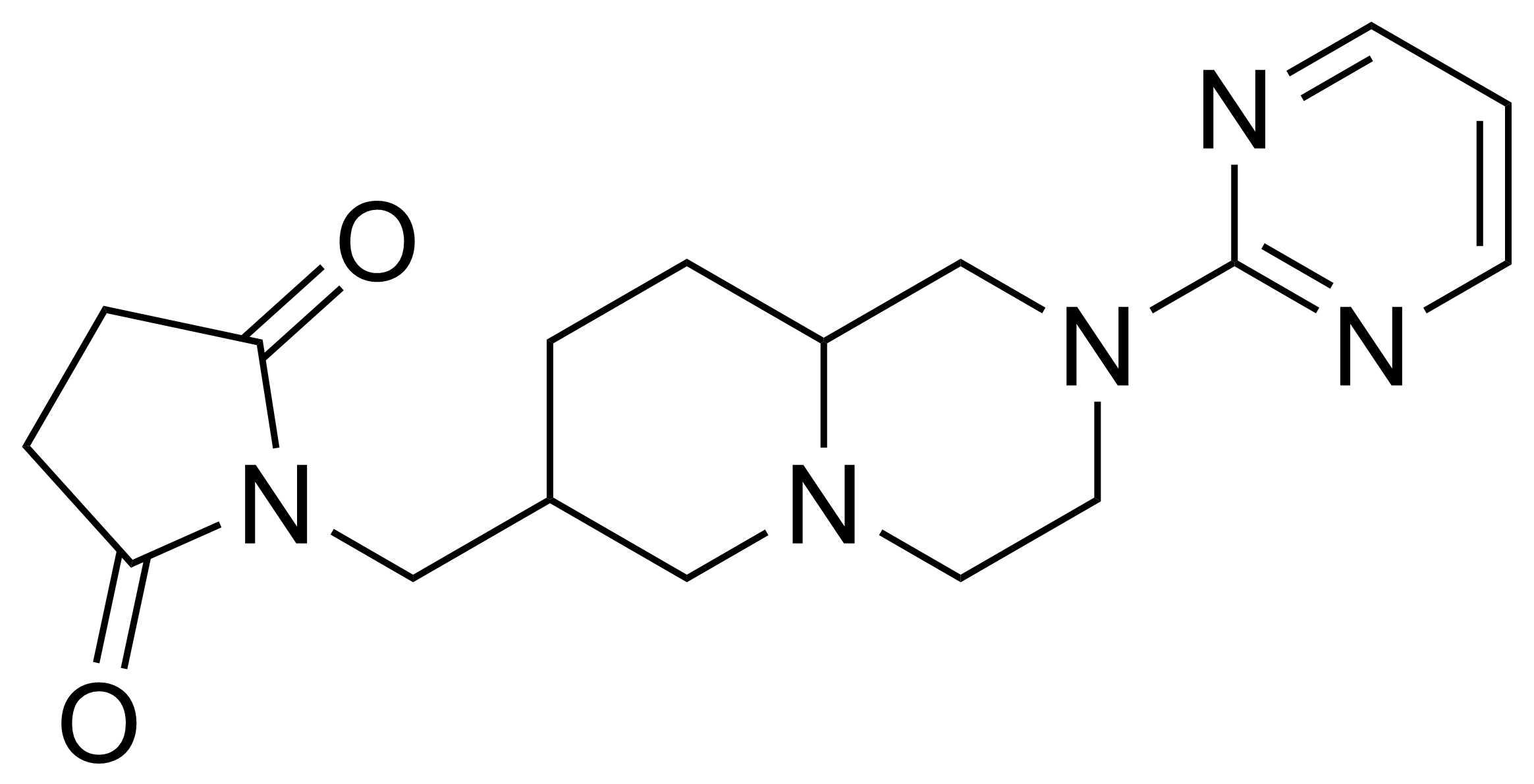

Clinical data
- Other names: CP-93,393
- Routes of administration: Oral
- ATC code: none

Identifiers
- IUPAC name: 1-{[2-(pyrimidin-2-yl)octahydro-2H-pyrido[1,2-a]pyrazin-7-yl]methyl}pyrrolidine-2,5-dione
- CAS Number: 131831-03-3; HCl: 148408-65-5
- PubChem CID: 9799246
- ChemSpider: 7975011
- UNII: 2GT50C8U60; HCl: 1NYW5HLO1E
- KEGG: D02569
- ChEMBL: ChEMBL380369

Chemical and physical data
- Formula: C_{17}H_{23}N_{5}O_{2}
- Molar mass: 329.404 g·mol^{−1}
- 3D model (JSmol): Interactive image
- SMILES: O=C1N(C(=O)CC1)CC4CCC3N(CCN(c2ncccn2)C3)C4

Sunepitron (developmental code name CP-93,393) is a combined 5-HT_{1A} receptor agonist and α_{2}-adrenergic receptor antagonist. It was previously under development by Pfizer for the treatment of depression and anxiety. It made it to phase III clinical trials before being discontinued.

== Chemistry ==
=== Synthesis ===
Sunepitron synthesis: G.N. Bright, K.A. Desai, U.S. patent 5,122,525 (1992).

The synthesis starts by conversion of the pyridine dicarboxylic acid (1) to its acid chloride; rxn with MeOH then affords the ester (2). Catalytic hydrogenation serves to reduce the pyridine ring to a piperidine of undefined stereochemistry (3). Alkylation of this intermediate with chloroacetonitrile affords (4). Treatment of that intermediate with Raney nickel reduces the cyano group to the corresponding primary amine; this product then undergoes an internal ester-amine interchange to yield the cyclized lactam (5). LAH serves to reduce the lactam to an amine; the ester on the other ring is reduced to a carbinol in the process, affording the aminoalcohol (7). The basic function is next alkylated with 2-chloropyrimidine (7). Rxn of the alcoholin (8) with MsCl leads to the mesylate; that group is next displaced by sodium azide (9); the azide group is next reduced to the primary amine. Resolution of this product as its mandelate salt then yields (10) as a single enantiomer. Rxn of that product with succinic anhydride converts the pendant amine to a succinimide, affording the anxiolytic agent sunepitron (1).

== See also ==
- Lesopitron
