= Anaprazole =

Identifiers
- IUPAC name: 2-[[3-(3-methoxypropoxy)-2-methylphenyl]methylsulfinyl]-6,7-dihydro-1H-furo[2,3-f]benzimidazole
- PubChem CID: 156009457
- ChemSpider: 128732661; Na^{+} salt: 128433794
- UNII: W6OO9ZB0FC
- ChEMBL: ChEMBL4651083; Na^{+} salt: ChEMBL4650347

Chemical and physical data
- Formula: C_{21}H_{24}N_{2}O_{4}S
- Molar mass: 400.49 g·mol^{−1}
- 3D model (JSmol): Interactive image
- SMILES: CC1=C(C=CC=C1OCCCOC)CS(=O)C2=NC3=C(N2)C=C4CCOC4=C3
- InChI: InChI=InChI=1S/C21H24N2O4S/c1-14-16(5-3-6-19(14)26-9-4-8-25-2)13-28(24)21-22-17-11-15-7-10-27-20(15)12-18(17)23-21/h3,5-6,11-12H,4,7-10,13H2,1-2H3,(H,22,23); Key:JYSIFLQJDVIWKM-UHFFFAOYSA-N

Anaprazole is a pharmaceutical drug used for the treatment of duodenal ulcers. It is classified as a proton pump inhibitor (PPI). It was approved for use in China in 2023. It is formulated as its sodium salt, anaprazole sodium, in enteric-coated tablets.
