= GSK-958108 =

Clinical data
- Other names: GSK958108
- Drug class: Serotonin 5-HT_{1A} receptor antagonist
- ATC code: None

Identifiers
- IUPAC name: 7-methyl-6-[2-[4-(2-methylquinolin-5-yl)piperazin-1-yl]ethyl]-4,5-dihydroimidazo[1,5-a]quinoline-3-carboxamide
- CAS Number: 876924-95-7
- PubChem CID: 44138100
- ChemSpider: 133344165
- UNII: CC3QFH9UUA
- ChEMBL: ChEMBL6068554

Chemical and physical data
- Formula: C_{29}H_{32}N_{6}O
- Molar mass: 480.616 g·mol^{−1}
- 3D model (JSmol): Interactive image
- SMILES: CC1=C(C2=C(C=C1)N3C=NC(=C3CC2)C(=O)N)CCN4CCN(CC4)C5=CC=CC6=C5C=CC(=N6)C
- InChI: InChI=1S/C29H32N6O/c1-19-6-10-26-22(9-11-27-28(29(30)36)31-18-35(26)27)21(19)12-13-33-14-16-34(17-15-33)25-5-3-4-24-23(25)8-7-20(2)32-24/h3-8,10,18H,9,11-17H2,1-2H3,(H2,30,36); Key:RKWZRKZRPIUILS-UHFFFAOYSA-N

GSK-958108 is a serotonergic drug derived from the phenylpiperazine family which acts as a potent and selective 5-HT_{1A} receptor antagonist, and has been researched as a potential treatment for sexual dysfunction.

== See also ==
- Robalzotan
- SDZ-216-525
- WAY-100635
