= Synergistic system =

System of nonlinear differential equations

A Synergistic system (or S-system) is a collection of ordinary nonlinear differential equations

$\frac{dx_i}{dt}= \alpha_{i} \prod_{j=1}^{n+m} x_i ^{g_{ij}}- \beta_{j} \prod_{j=1}^{n+m} x_i ^{h_{ij}} ~~~~~ (i=1,...,n)$

where the $x_{i}$ are positive real, $\alpha_{i}$ and $\beta_{i}$ are non-negative real, called the rate constant(or, kinetic rates) and $g_{ij}$ and $h_{ij}$ are real exponential, called kinetic orders. These terms are based on the chemical equilibrium

== One variable S-system ==
In the case of $n=1 (i=1)$ and $m=0$, the given S-system equation can be written as

$\ \frac{dx}{dt}= \alpha x^{g}-\beta x^{h} \$

Under the non-zero steady condition, $\frac{dx_0}{dt}= 0$, the following non-linear equation can be transformed into an ordinary differential equation(ODE).

Transformation one variable S-system into a first-order ODE

Let $x=e^{\operatorname{log} x}=e^{y}$(with $x_0=e^{y_0}$) Then, given a one-variable S-system is

$\frac{dy}{dt}=\alpha e^{(g-1)y}-\beta e^{(h-1)y}$

Apply a non-zero steady condition to the given equation

$0=\frac{dy_{0}}{dt}=\alpha e^{(g-1)y_{0}}-\beta e^{(h-1)y_{0}}$, or equivalently $\alpha e^{(g-1)y_{0}}=\beta e^{(h-1)y_{0}}$

Thus, $y_0 = \frac{\operatorname{log}\beta-\operatorname{log}\alpha}{g-h}$(or, $x_0 = \left(\frac{\beta}{\alpha}\right)^{\frac{1}{g-h}}$)

If $\frac{dy}{dt}$ can be approximated around $y=y_0$, remaining the first two terms,

$\frac{dy}{dt} \simeq \alpha e^{(g-1)y_0}+\alpha e^{(g-1)y_0}(g-1)(y-y_{0})-\beta e^{(g-1)y_0} - \beta e^{(h-1)y_0}(h-1)(y-y_{0})$

By non-zero steady condition, $\alpha e^{(g-1)y_{0}}=\beta e^{(h-1)y_{0}}$, a nonlinear one-variable S-system can be transformed into a first-order ODE:

$\frac{du}{dt} \simeq \left ( \alpha e^{(g-1)y_0} (g-h) \right )u= \left ( Fa \right )u$

where $F=\alpha e^{(g-1)y_0}$, $a=g-h$, and $u=y-y_0 \simeq \frac{x-x_0}{x_0}$, called a percentage variation.

== Two variables S-system ==
In the case of $n=2 (i=1,2)$ and $m=0$ , the S-system equation can be written as system of (non-linear) differential equations.

$$\left\{\begin{matrix}
\frac{dx_1}{dt}= \alpha_{1}x_{1}^{g_{11}}x_2^{g_{21}}-\beta_{1}x_{1}^{h_{11}}x_{2}^{h_{21}} \ \\
\frac{dx_2}{dt}= \alpha_{2}x_{2}^{g_{21}}x_2^{g_{22}}-\beta_{2}x_{1}^{h_{21}}x_{2}^{h_{22}}
\end{matrix}\right.$$

Assume non-zero steady condition, $\frac{dx_{i0}}{dt}= 0$.

Transformation two variables S-system into a second-order ODE

By putting $x_{i}=e^{\operatorname{log} x_{i}}=e^{y_{i}}$ . The given system of equations can be written as

$$\left\{\begin{matrix}
\frac{d u_{1}}{dt}= c_{11}u_{1}+ c_{12}u_{2}  \ \\
\frac{d u_{2}}{dt}= c_{21}u_{1}+ c_{22}u_{2}
\end{matrix}\right.$$

(where $u_{i}=y_{i}-y_{i0}$, $u_{i}=y_{i}-y_{i0}$ and $c_{ij}(i,j=1,2)$ are constant.

Since $\frac{d^{2}u_{1}}{dt^{2}}=c_{11}\frac{du_{1}}{dt}+c_{12}\frac{du_{2}}{dt}$, the given system of equation can be approximated as a second-order ODE:

$\frac{d^{2}u_{1}}{dt^{2}}- \left ( c_{11}+c_{22} \right )\frac{du_{1}}{dt}+\left ( c_{11}c_{22}-c_{12}c_{21} \right )u_{1}=0$,

== Applications ==
=== Mass-action Law ===
Consider the following chemical pathway:

$\ce{A + 2B ->[k_1] C ->[k_2] 3D + E}$

where $k_{1}$ and $k_{2}$ are rate constants.

Then the mass-action law applied to species $\ce{C}$ gives the equation

$\frac{d[C]}{dt}=k_1[A][B]^{2}-k_{2}[D]^{3}[E]$

(where $[A]$ is a concentration of A etc.)

=== Komarova Model (Bone Remodeling) ===
Komarova Model is an example of a two-variable system of non-linear differential equations that describes bone remodeling. This equation is regulated by biochemical factors called paracrine and autocrine, which quantify the bone mass in each step.

$$\left\{\begin{matrix}
\quad \frac{dx_{1}}{dt} = \alpha_{1} x_{1}^{g_{11}}x_{2}^{g_{21}}-\beta_{1}x_{1}
\\ \quad \frac{dx_{2}}{dt} = \alpha_{2} x_{1}^{g_{12}}x_{2}^{g_{22}}-\beta_{2}x_{2}
\\ \frac{dz}{dt}= -k_{1}y_{1}+k_{2}y_{2}
\end{matrix}\right.$$

Where

- $x_1$, $x_2$: The number of osteoclast/osteoblasts
- $\alpha_{1}$, $\alpha_{2}$: Osteoclast/Osteoblast production rate
- $\beta_{1}$, $\beta_{2}$: Osteoclast/Osteoblast removal rate
- $g_{ij}$: Paracrine factor on the $j$-cell due to the presence of $i$-cell
- $z$: The bone mass percentage
- $y_{i}$: Let $\bar{x_i}$ be the difference between the number of osteoclasts/osteoblasts and its steady state. Then $y_{i}:=\frac{1}{2} \left [ \left ( x_{i} - \bar{x_{i}})+(x_{i}-\bar{x_{i}}) \right ) \right ]$

=== Modified Komarova Model (Bone Remodeling with Tumor affecting, Bone metastasis) ===
The modified Komarova Model describes the tumor effect on the osteoclasts and osteoblasts rate. The following equation can be described as

$$\left\{\begin{matrix}
\frac{dx_{1}}{dt} = \widehat{ \alpha_{1}(\omega)}x_{1}^{g_{11}}x_{2}^{g_{21}}-\widehat{\beta_{1}(\omega)}x_{1}
\\ \frac{dx_{2}}{dt} = \widehat{ \alpha_{2}(\omega)} x_{2}^{g_{22}}-\widehat{ \beta_{2}(\omega)}x_{2}
\\ \frac{d\omega}{dt}= \mu \omega \operatorname{log}\left (\sigma \frac{L_{\omega}}{\omega}  \right )
\end{matrix}\right.$$

(with initial condition $x_1(0)=x_{10}$, $x_2(0)=x_{20}$, and $\omega(0)=\omega_{0}$)

Where

- $x_1$, $x_2$: The number of osteoclast/osteoblasts.
- $\omega=\omega(t)$ : The tumor representation depending on time $t$
- $\widehat{\alpha_{1}(\omega)}$,$\widehat{\alpha_{2}(\omega)}$: The representation of the activity of cell production
- $\widehat{\beta_{1}(\omega)}$,$\widehat{\beta_{2}(\omega)}$: The representation of the activity of cell removal
- $g_{ij}$: The net effectiveness of osteoclast/osteoblast derived autocrine and paracrine factors
- $\mu$ : The tumor cell proliferation rate
- $L_{\omega}$: The upper limit value for tumor cells
- $\sigma$ : Scaling constant of tumor growth
