= Proadifen =

Names
- Preferred IUPAC name 2-(Diethylamino)ethyl 2,2-diphenylpentanoate
- Other names SKF 525-A

Identifiers
CAS Number	302-33-0
3D model (JSmol)	Interactive image
ChEMBL	ChEMBL282567
ChemSpider	4741
PubChem CID	4910
UNII	A510CA4CBT
CompTox Dashboard (EPA)	DTXSID2048452
- InChI: InChI=1S/C23H31NO2/c1-4-17-23(20-13-9-7-10-14-20,21-15-11-8-12-16-21)22(25)26-19-18-24(5-2)6-3/h7-16H,4-6,17-19H2,1-3H3
- SMILES: O=C(OCCN(CC)CC)C(c1ccccc1)(c2ccccc2)CCC

Properties
Chemical formula	C_{23}H_{31}NO_{2}
Molar mass	353.506 g·mol^{−1}
- Except where otherwise noted, data are given for materials in their standard state (at 25 °C [77 °F], 100 kPa). Infobox references

Proadifen (SKF-525A) is a non-selective inhibitor of cytochrome P450 enzymes, preventing some types of drug metabolism. It is also an inhibitor of neuronal nitric oxide synthase (NOS), CYP-dependent (cytochrome P450-dependent) arachidonate metabolism, transmembrane calcium influx, and platelet thromboxane synthesis. Further documented effects include the blockade of ATP-sensitive inward rectifier potassium channel 8 (KIR6.1), and stimulation of endothelial cell prostacyclin production.

Proadifen exerts apoptotic/anti-proliferate (tumor suppressing) effects in certain forms of cancer (HT-29 colon adenocarcinoma), believed to be caused by mediation of glycogen synthase kinase 3 β (GSK-3β). In the same study administration of proadifen was demonstrated to produce time- and dose-dependent phosphatidylserine externalization, caspase-3 activation and PARP cleavage. Intense upregulation of NAG-1 and ATF3 and downregulation of Mcl-1 and Egr-1 were also observed.

Proadifen has been demonstrated to normally inhibit the nicotinic acetylcholine receptor (NAChR) and muscarinic acetylcholine receptor (MAChR) in rats.
