= CT-5126 =

Clinical data
- Other names: CT5126; 5-Methoxy-6,8-dichloro-3-aminochroman
- ATC code: None

Identifiers
- IUPAC name: 6,8-dichloro-5-methoxy-3,4-dihydro-2H-1-benzopyran-3-amine

Chemical and physical data
- Formula: C_{10}H_{11}Cl_{2}NO_{2}
- Molar mass: 248.10 g·mol^{−1}
- 3D model (JSmol): Interactive image
- SMILES: C(Cl)1=CC(Cl)=C2OCC(N([H])[H])CC2=C1OC
- InChI: InChI=1S/C10H11Cl2NO2/c1-14-9-6-2-5(13)4-15-10(6)8(12)3-7(9)11/h3,5H,2,4,13H2,1H3; Key:GBGLQBXBXUZMLW-UHFFFAOYSA-N

CT-5126, also known as 5-methoxy-6,8-dichloro-3-aminochroman, is a cyclized phenethylamine and 3-aminochroman derivative related to psychedelic phenethylamines like mescaline. In contrast to its non-cyclized analogue CT-5172 (2,6-dimethoxy-3,5-dichlorophenethylamine), the drug was found to have negligible hallucinogen-like effects in cats. CT-5126 was first described in the scientific literature by 1969. Various related analogues, such as CT-5172 and CT-4719, have also been described. CT-5126 and related compounds were developed at the Laboratoire de Chimie Thérapeutique (CT; Therapeutic Chemistry Laboratory) of the Pasteur Institute in Paris, France.

== See also ==
- 3-Aminochroman
- Cyclized phenethylamine
- Phenoxyethylamine
- 5-MeO-DPAC
- TFMBOX
- DOM-AT
- DOM-CR
- 2,6-Dimethoxyamphetamine
