= Dotarizine =

Calcium channel blocker used in the treatment of migraine

Clinical data
- ATC code: none

Identifiers
- IUPAC name: 1-[diphenylmethyl]-4-[3-(2-phenyl-1,3-dioxolan-2-yl)propyl]piperazine
- CAS Number: 84625-59-2
- PubChem CID: 55285
- ChemSpider: 49929
- UNII: IO7663S6D3
- ChEBI: CHEBI:138033
- ChEMBL: ChEMBL2106316
- CompTox Dashboard (EPA): DTXSID60233630

Chemical and physical data
- Formula: C_{29}H_{34}N_{2}O_{2}
- Molar mass: 442.603 g·mol^{−1}
- 3D model (JSmol): Interactive image
- SMILES: C1CN(CCN1CCCC2(OCCO2)C3=CC=CC=C3)C(C4=CC=CC=C4)C5=CC=CC=C5
- InChI: InChI=1S/C29H34N2O2/c1-4-11-25(12-5-1)28(26-13-6-2-7-14-26)31-21-19-30(20-22-31)18-10-17-29(32-23-24-33-29)27-15-8-3-9-16-27/h1-9,11-16,28H,10,17-24H2; Key:LRMJAFKKJLRDLE-UHFFFAOYSA-N

Dotarizine is a drug used in the treatment of migraine, which acts as a calcium channel blocker, and also as an antagonist at the 5-HT_{2A} receptor, and to a lesser extent at the 5-HT_{1A} and 5-HT_{2C} receptors. The anti-migraine action is thought to be due to its action as a vasodilator, but it also has some anxiolytic effects and blocks amnesia produced by electroconvulsive shock in animals.
