= Adatanserin =

Chemical compound

Clinical data
- Drug class: Serotonin 5-HT_{1A} receptor agonist; Serotonin 5-HT_{2A} receptor antagonist; Serotonin 5-HT_{2C} receptor antagonist
- ATC code: none

Identifiers
- IUPAC name: N-[2-(4-pyrimidin-2-ylpiperazin-1-yl)ethyl]adamantane-1-carboxamide
- CAS Number: 127266-56-2
- PubChem CID: 130918
- ChemSpider: 115774
- UNII: W5U6WQM26H
- ChEMBL: ChEMBL2107510
- CompTox Dashboard (EPA): DTXSID90869749

Chemical and physical data
- Formula: C_{21}H_{31}N_{5}O
- Molar mass: 369.513 g·mol^{−1}
- 3D model (JSmol): Interactive image
- SMILES: O=C(NCCN2CCN(c1ncccn1)CC2)C35CC4CC(CC(C3)C4)C5
- InChI: InChI=1S/C21H31N5O/c27-19(21-13-16-10-17(14-21)12-18(11-16)15-21)22-4-5-25-6-8-26(9-7-25)20-23-2-1-3-24-20/h1-3,16-18H,4-15H2,(H,22,27); Key:HPFLVTSWRFCPCV-UHFFFAOYSA-N

Adatanserin (WY-50,324, SEB-324) is a mixed 5-HT_{1A} receptor partial agonist and 5-HT_{2A} and 5-HT_{2C} receptor antagonist. It was under development by Wyeth as an antidepressant but was ultimately not pursued.

Adantaserin has been shown to be neuroprotective against ischemia-induced glutamatergic excitotoxicity, an effect which appears to be mediated by blockade of the 5-HT_{2A} receptor.

== Synthesis ==

2-Chloropyrimidine (1) reacts with piperazine (2), forming 2-(1-piperazinyl)pyrimidine (3). Treatment with the phthalimide derivative N-(2-bromoethyl)phthalimide (4) in an alkylation reaction produces (5), which is deprotected using hydrazine to give the primary amine (6). Amide formation with the acid chloride of 1-adamantanecarboxylic acid yields adatanserin.

== See also ==
- Flibanserin
