= Piclozotan =

Chemical compound

Legal status
- Legal status: In general: uncontrolled

Identifiers
- IUPAC name: 3-chloro-4-[4-[4-(2-pyridinyl)-1,2,3,6-tetrahydropyridin-1-yl]butyl]-1,4-benzoxazepin-5(4H)-one
- CAS Number: 182415-09-4
- PubChem CID: 9801640
- ChemSpider: 7977402
- UNII: FQE44HS7AH
- CompTox Dashboard (EPA): DTXSID90870153

Chemical and physical data
- Formula: C_{23}H_{24}ClN_{3}O_{2}
- Molar mass: 409.91 g·mol^{−1}
- 3D model (JSmol): Interactive image
- SMILES: C1CN(CC=C1C2=CC=CC=N2)CCCCN3C(=COC4=CC=CC=C4C3=O)Cl
- InChI: InChI=1S/C23H24ClN3O2/c24-22-17-29-21-9-2-1-7-19(21)23(28)27(22)14-6-5-13-26-15-10-18(11-16-26)20-8-3-4-12-25-20/h1-4,7-10,12,17H,5-6,11,13-16H2; Key:URMTUEWUIGOJBW-UHFFFAOYSA-N

Piclozotan (SUN-N4057) is a selective 5-HT_{1A} receptor partial agonist, which has neuroprotective effects in animal studies. It has been through early clinical trials in humans for treatment of acute stroke, but results have not yet been announced.

== See also ==
- List of investigational Parkinson's disease drugs
- Repinotan
- Robalzotan
- Buspirone/zolmitriptan
