= GR-46611 =

Clinical data
- Other names: GR46611
- Drug class: Serotonin 5-HT_{1} receptor agonist; Serotonin 5-HT_{1A} receptor agonist; Serotonin 5-HT_{1B} receptor agonist; Serotonin 5-HT_{1D} receptor agonist
- ATC code: None

Identifiers
- IUPAC name: (E)-3-[3-[2-(dimethylamino)ethyl]-1H-indol-5-yl]-N-[(4-methoxyphenyl)methyl]prop-2-enamide
- CAS Number: 185259-85-2
- PubChem CID: 6160690
- ChemSpider: 4827659
- ChEBI: CHEBI:93195
- ChEMBL: ChEMBL344127

Chemical and physical data
- Formula: C_{23}H_{27}N_{3}O_{2}
- Molar mass: 377.488 g·mol^{−1}
- 3D model (JSmol): Interactive image
- SMILES: CN(C)CCC1=CNC2=C1C=C(C=C2)/C=C/C(=O)NCC3=CC=C(C=C3)OC
- InChI: InChI=1S/C23H27N3O2/c1-26(2)13-12-19-16-24-22-10-6-17(14-21(19)22)7-11-23(27)25-15-18-4-8-20(28-3)9-5-18/h4-11,14,16,24H,12-13,15H2,1-3H3,(H,25,27)/b11-7+; Key:LBVZWEWTNUDWNS-YRNVUSSQSA-N

GR-46611 is a non-selective serotonin 5-HT_{1} receptor agonist of the triptan group which has been used in scientific research. It is specifically an agonist of the serotonin 5-HT_{1A}, 5-HT_{1B}, and 5-HT_{1D} receptors. The drug's affinities (K_{i}) are 1.3 nM for the serotonin 5-HT_{1A} receptor, 0.1 to 1.3 nM for the serotonin 5-HT_{1B} receptor, and 0.2 to 1.0 nM for the serotonin 5-HT_{1D} receptor. Conversely, it showed very weak affinity for the serotonin 5-HT_{2A} receptor (K_{i} = 1,000 nM). The drug does not alter or stimulate locomotor activity when given alone in rodents, but does potentiate the hyperlocomotion induced by the serotonin 5-HT_{1A} receptor agonists 8-OH-DPAT and buspirone. The chemical synthesis of GR-46611 has been described. GR-46611 was first described in the scientific literature by 1994.

== See also ==
- Substituted tryptamine
