= ORG-37684 =

Chemical compound

Clinical data
- Other names: ORG37684; ORG-37,684
- Drug class: Serotonin 5-HT_{2} receptor agonist; Serotonin 5-HT_{2C} receptor agonist; Serotonin 5-HT_{2A} receptor agonist
- ATC code: None

Legal status
- Legal status: In general: uncontrolled

Identifiers
- IUPAC name: (3S)-3-[(2,3-dihydro-5-methoxy-1H-inden-4-yl)oxy]pyrrolidine
- CAS Number: 436083-07-7 213007-95-5 (hydrochloride)
- PubChem CID: 9794656
- IUPHAR/BPS: 171
- ChemSpider: 7970423
- UNII: Y4D42A6EDS
- CompTox Dashboard (EPA): DTXSID201029269

Chemical and physical data
- Formula: C_{14}H_{19}NO_{2}
- Molar mass: 233.311 g·mol^{−1}
- 3D model (JSmol): Interactive image
- SMILES: O(c1c(OC)ccc2c1CCC2)[C@H]3CCNC3
- InChI: InChI=1S/C14H19NO2/c1-16-13-6-5-10-3-2-4-12(10)14(13)17-11-7-8-15-9-11/h5-6,11,15H,2-4,7-9H2,1H3/t11-/m0/s1; Key:QDJAYXYEXHVXJV-NSHDSACASA-N

ORG-37684 is a drug developed by Organon, which acts as a potent and selective agonist for the 5-HT_{2} receptor family, including of the serotonin 5-HT_{2C}, 5-HT_{2B}, and 5-HT_{2A} receptors, in that order of potency. It has anorectic effects in animal studies and has been researched as a potential weight loss drug for use in humans. ORG-37684 produces the head-twitch response, a behavioral proxy of psychedelic effects, and hence may be hallucinogenic in humans. The drug was under development for the treatment of major depressive disorder in the 1990s and early 2000s, and reached the preclinical research stage, but development was discontinued and it was never marketed.

== See also ==
- Phenoxyethylamine
- List of investigational antidepressants
- CT-4719
- ORG-12962
- Quipazine
