= AZD3676 =

Clinical data
- Other names: AZD-3676
- Drug class: Serotonin 5-HT_{1A} and 5-HT_{1B} antagonist
- ATC code: None

Identifiers
- IUPAC name: N,N-dimethyl-7-[4-(2-pyridin-2-ylethyl)piperazin-1-yl]-1-benzofuran-2-carboxamide
- CAS Number: 1259929-13-9
- PubChem CID: 49848635
- ChemSpider: 58935311
- UNII: 8V77H3245C
- ChEMBL: ChEMBL3647269

Chemical and physical data
- Formula: C_{22}H_{26}N_{4}O_{2}
- Molar mass: 378.476 g·mol^{−1}
- 3D model (JSmol): Interactive image
- SMILES: CN(C)C(=O)C1=CC2=C(O1)C(=CC=C2)N3CCN(CC3)CCC4=CC=CC=N4
- InChI: InChI=1S/C22H26N4O2/c1-24(2)22(27)20-16-17-6-5-8-19(21(17)28-20)26-14-12-25(13-15-26)11-9-18-7-3-4-10-23-18/h3-8,10,16H,9,11-15H2,1-2H3; Key:MKTRMPIBOZYXTR-UHFFFAOYSA-N

AZD3676 is a drug which acts as a potent and selective antagonist for the 5-HT_{1A} receptor and 5-HT_{1B} receptors, with some selectivity for 5-HT_{1A}. It has been researched for potential applications in the treatment of cognitive impairment in Alzheimer's disease.

== See also ==
- DU-125530
- GSK-588045
- SB-272183
- WAY-100635
