= Quilostigmine =

Acetylcholinesterase inhibitor

Names
- IUPAC name [(3aR,8bS)-3,4,8b-Trimethyl-2,3a-dihydro-1H-pyrrolo[2,3-b]indol-7-yl] 3,4-dihydro-1H-isoquinoline-2-carboxylate

Identifiers
3D model (JSmol)	Interactive image
ChEBI	CHEBI:188879
ChEMBL	ChEMBL1243298
ChemSpider	116784
KEGG	D03823
PubChem CID	132228
UNII	2L1YNO4SQJ
CompTox Dashboard (EPA)	DTXSID801350915
- InChI: InChI=1S/C23H27N3O2/c1-23-11-13-24(2)21(23)25(3)20-9-8-18(14-19(20)23)28-22(27)26-12-10-16-6-4-5-7-17(16)15-26/h4-9,14,21H,10-13,15H2,1-3H3/t21-,23+/m1/s1
- SMILES: C[C@@]12CCN([C@@H]1N(C3=C2C=C(C=C3)OC(=O)N4CCC5=CC=CC=C5C4)C)C

Properties
Chemical formula	C_{23}H_{27}N_{3}O_{2}
Molar mass	377.488 g·mol^{−1}
- Except where otherwise noted, data are given for materials in their standard state (at 25 °C [77 °F], 100 kPa). Infobox references

Quilostigmine, also known as NXX-066, is an acetylcholinesterase inhibitor. Its structure is related to that of physostigmine, another acetylcholinesterase (AChE) inhibitor.

== Biological activity ==
Quilostigmine displays inhibition of the AChE enzyme with an IC_{50} value of 0.148 μM.

== History ==
Quilostigmine was initially studied by AstraZeneca for the treatment of Alzheimer's disease; however, the drug appears to have been discontinued, reaching a maximum trial phase of two.
