= WAY-100135 =

Chemical compound

Clinical data
- Other names: WAY100135; WAY-100,135
- Drug class: Serotonin 5-HT_{1A} receptor antagonist; Serotonin 5-HT_{1D} receptor agonist
- ATC code: None

Identifiers
- IUPAC name: (S)-N-tert-butyl-3-(4-(2-methoxyphenyl)-piperazin-1-yl)-2-phenylpropanamide
- CAS Number: 133025-23-7
- PubChem CID: 115111
- IUPHAR/BPS: 79
- ChemSpider: 103008
- ChEMBL: ChEMBL38288
- CompTox Dashboard (EPA): DTXSID80927903

Chemical and physical data
- Formula: C_{24}H_{33}N_{3}O_{2}
- Molar mass: 395.547 g·mol^{−1}
- 3D model (JSmol): Interactive image
- SMILES: c2ccccc2C(C(=O)NC(C)(C)C)CN(CC3)CCN3c1ccccc1OC
- InChI: InChI=1S/C24H33N3O2/c1-24(2,3)25-23(28)20(19-10-6-5-7-11-19)18-26-14-16-27(17-15-26)21-12-8-9-13-22(21)29-4/h5-13,20H,14-18H2,1-4H3,(H,25,28); Key:UMTDAKAAYOXIKU-UHFFFAOYSA-N

WAY-100135 is a serotonergic drug of the phenylpiperazine family which is used in scientific research. It acts as potent serotonin 5-HT_{1A} receptor antagonist, and was originally believed to be highly selective, but further studies have demonstrated that it also acts as a partial agonist of the serotonin 5-HT_{1D} receptor (pK_{i} = 7.58; virtually the same affinity for 5-HT_{1A}), and to a much lesser extent, of the serotonin 5-HT_{1B} receptor (pK_{i} = 5.82). These findings may have prompted the development of the related compound WAY-100635, another purportedly selective and even more potent 5-HT_{1A} antagonist, which was synthesized shortly thereafter. However, WAY-100635 turned out to be non-selective as well, having been shown to act additionally as a potent D_{4} receptor agonist later on.

== See also ==
- WAY-100635
