= Robalzotan =

Chemical compound

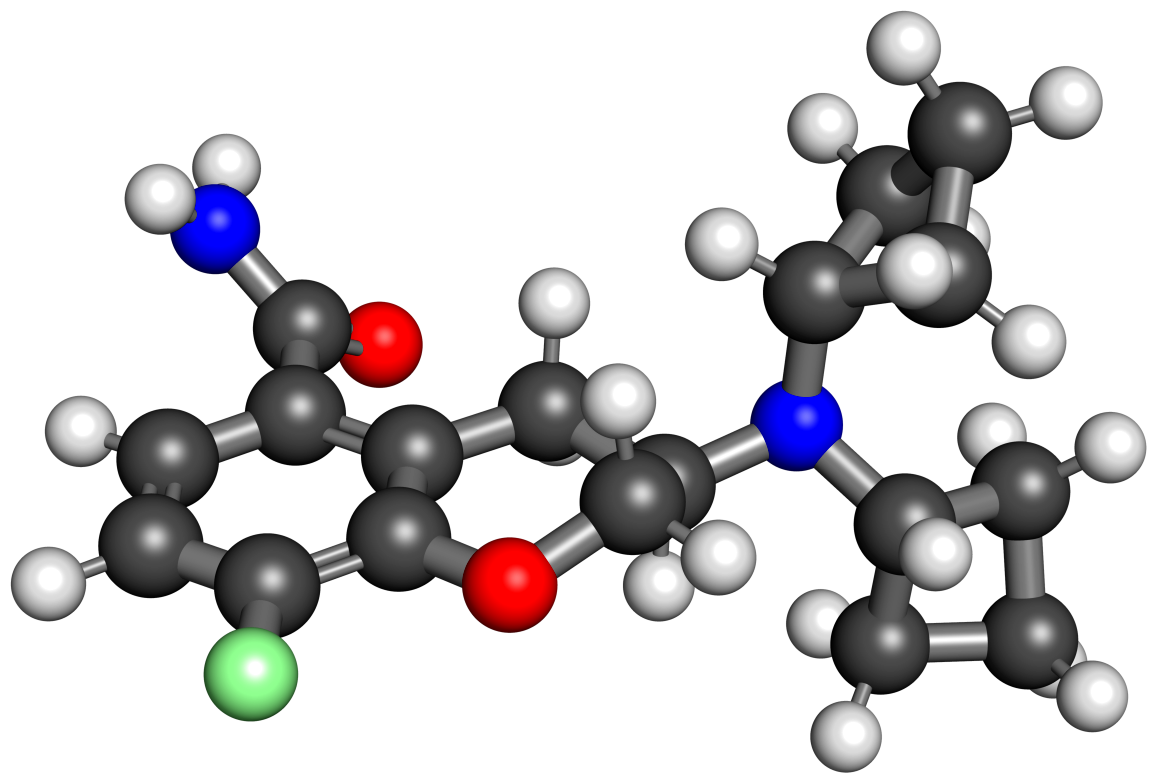

Clinical data
- Other names: NAD-299; NAD299; AZD-371; AZD371
- Routes of administration: Oral
- Drug class: Serotonin 5-HT_{1A} receptor antagonist
- ATC code: None

Legal status
- Legal status: In general: uncontrolled

Pharmacokinetic data
- Bioavailability: 4–25% (rats)
- Protein binding: 2%
- Elimination half-life: 1.5 hours

Identifiers
- IUPAC name: (3R)-3-[di(cyclobutyl)amino]-8-fluoro-3,4-dihydro-2H-chromene-5-carboxamide
- CAS Number: 169758-66-1
- PubChem CID: 3055171
- IUPHAR/BPS: 72
- DrugBank: DB06538
- ChemSpider: 2316732
- UNII: I18M56OGME
- ChEMBL: ChEMBL1628569
- CompTox Dashboard (EPA): DTXSID30168743

Chemical and physical data
- Formula: C_{18}H_{23}FN_{2}O_{2}
- Molar mass: 318.392 g·mol^{−1}
- 3D model (JSmol): Interactive image
- SMILES: C1CC(C1)N(C2CCC2)[C@@H]3CC4=C(C=CC(=C4OC3)F)C(=O)N
- InChI: InChI=1S/C18H23FN2O2/c19-16-8-7-14(18(20)22)15-9-13(10-23-17(15)16)21(11-3-1-4-11)12-5-2-6-12/h7-8,11-13H,1-6,9-10H2,(H2,20,22)/t13-/m1/s1; Key:MQTUXRKNJYPMCG-CYBMUJFWSA-N

Robalzotan (INN, BAN; developmental code names NAD-299 and AZD-7371) is a selective serotonin 5-HT_{1A} receptor antagonist which was under development for the treatment of major depressive disorder, anxiety disorders, gastrointestinal disorders, irritable bowel syndrome (IBS), and overactive bladder but was never marketed.

It shows high affinity for the serotonin 5-HT_{1A} receptor (K_{i} = 0.24–0.6 nM) and more than 500-fold selectivity for this receptor over other serotonin receptors. The drug was shown to completely reverse the autoreceptor-mediated inhibition of serotonin release induced by the administration of selective serotonin reuptake inhibitors (SSRIs) like citalopram in rodent studies. It produces hyperlocomotion in rodents at high doses. The elimination half-life of robalzotan in humans is short at approximately 1.5 hours. The drug achieved 62 to 85% occupancy of the serotonin 5-HT_{1A} receptor at the time of peak concentrations in humans as measured with positron emission tomography (PET) imaging.

Robalzotan was investigated by AstraZeneca as a potential antidepressant, but like many other serotonin 5-HT_{1A} receptor modulators, was discontinued. Later on, it was also researched for other indications, such as IBS, but was dropped once again due to lack of effectiveness as well as a poor tolerability profile, which included effects such as "hallucinations or hallucination-like adverse events".

Other serotonin 5-HT_{1A} receptor antagonists such as (S)-UH-301 and WAY-100635 have notably been found to produce the head-twitch response, a behavioral proxy of psychedelic effects, in rodents, with this effect mediated by disinhibition of serotonin release and consequent indirect activation of serotonin 5-HT_{2A} receptors. In addition, the serotonin 5-HT_{1A} receptor agonist buspirone markedly suppresses the hallucinogenic effects of psilocybin in humans, whereas the serotonin 5-HT_{1A} receptor antagonist pindolol moderately potentiates the psychedelic effects of dimethyltryptamine (DMT) in humans.

== See also ==
- 3-Aminochroman
- 5-MeO-DPAC
- Ebalzotan
- UH-232
- UH-301
