= British Study Centres School of English =

Language school in the UK, specializing in English language education

Coordinates: 51.519516°N 0.154148°W

- Established: 1996, placed into administration 2020
- Chairman: Michael Tunney
- Location: Central London, Dublin, Manchester, and York, United Kingdom
- Colours: Black, Orange & White
- Website: www.british-study.com

British Study Centres was a group of English language schools consisting of eight adult language schools and seventeen junior centres, including the City Football Language School in partnership with Manchester City, with the majority of schools and centres based in the UK. The head office was located in Brighton & Hove, East Sussex. When in operation, British Study Centres specialised in English language training for adults and young learners, teacher training courses for UK and overseas teachers and University Pathway programmes in partnership with NCUK.

== History and location ==
British Study Centres had its roots in distance learning courses from the 1930s onwards (a precursor to the Open University which grew up in the 1960s), branching off from its sister company West London College which offered further and higher education courses in 1996. The first school was opened in Oxford, and after a location move in 2008, it occupied the four-floor building of Oxenford House in the centre of the town. In 2002 the second college was opened in Brighton, and in 2004 a third school opened in Marylebone, central London. A fourth school opened in Bournemouth in May 2010 as well as a specialist teacher training facility in central Oxford which opened later that year. The college's head office moved from Hannah House to Duke Street, opposite Selfridges and adjoining Oxford Street, in early 2010. These schools have now closed down.

In 2008, the company moved into the young learners market with the acquisition of 'ICH' (International College Holidays), a provider of vacation courses to children. Since acquiring ICH, British Study Centres offered junior courses at independent schools in Ardingly, Cheltenham and Wycliffe. The company added a fourth UK centre in Brockenhurst, in 2013.

Across its adult schools and junior centres there was an annual intake of 7500 students consisting of approximately 80 nationalities in 2010.

In October 2020 British Study Centres went into administration and KPMG was appointed official receiver. As of July 2020 the company owed £13,275,000 to various unsecured creditors including students, staff, suppliers, landlords and host families. Prospective students who had paid for services but did not receive them comprised £2,492,038. Staff were owed over £1,000,000 in wages for work completed and HMRC was owed £567,959.

As of July 2023 the administrators had recovered only £160,000 of liquid assets and incurred costs of over £120,000. The administrators did not anticipate that any meaningful payments would be made to any of the unsecured creditors, who had in effect lost their money by transacting with British Study Centres.

== Membership ==
British Study Centres was a member of English UK.

The adult schools held a UKBA “Grade A” Tier 4 Sponsor's Licence.

== Courses ==
The schools offered full-time courses in the following subjects for adults: general English, academic English, business English and exam preparation for IELTS, TOEIC / TOEFL, BULATS and Cambridge FCE and CAE. The adult courses were offered in Bournemouth, Brighton, London and Oxford.

Teacher training qualifications offered included the Cambridge Certificate in General English Teaching to Adults (CELTA), Cambridge Diploma in General English Teaching to Adults (DELTA), and Trinity College Certificate in Teaching English to Speakers of Other Languages (CertTESOL). Teacher training took place in Brighton and Oxford.

Junior courses were offered in general English and English plus sports at four junior vacation centres in Ardingly, Bournemouth the University of Brighton, Oxford Brookes University and Wycliffe

In 2013, British Study Centres became one of the first UK-based EFL language schools to start offering online courses through video-conferencing. They used the same teachers from their UK schools to deliver General English, Business English and Exam Preparation courses to students around the world who were unable to travel to the UK to study.

== Charity affiliation ==
British Study Centres’ chosen charity was the Hot Courses Foundation. part of the Hot Courses Group, Set up in 2004, the charity helps fund the education of HIV+ children in the developing world whose access to education is limited or non-existent. British Study Centres' chairman, Simon Cleaver is trustee for the charity as well as Jeremy Hunt MP, Baroness Morris of Yardley (former Secretary of State for Education), Mike and Sarah Elms, Alex Williams and Simon Philips. The Foundation initially focused on AIDS-orphans in Kenya, providing money to fund their education and provide school uniforms and related resources. The Hot Courses Foundation then built a primary school in Kitui, eastern Kenya, which came top in recent assessments of schools in the area.
