= Hove College =

Private University in the United Kingdom

Coordinates: 50°49′57″N 0°09′45″W

- Motto: Brighton's College of Creativity
- Type: Private (Non-Profit)
- Established: 1977
- Parent institution: Stand Alone (Formerly British Study Centres)
- Affiliations: OCN London
- Endowment: NA
- Principal: Jeff Taylor
- Location: Brighton & Hove, East Sussex, BN3 3ER, United Kingdom
- Website: http://www.hovecollege.co.uk

Hove College is a private not for profit further education provider in Brighton and Hove, UK which offers training in multimedia, business, and design studies.

== History ==
Hove College was formerly part of the British Study Centres School of English and West London College but is now an independent not-for-profit business. Hove College remains located next to the Brighton branch of the British Study Centres.

== Course Specifications ==
Hove College delivers and issues courses at Certificate, Diploma, and Advanced diploma levels. The course content are accredited & approved by OCN London also known as "Open College Network London Region ". The College courses consist of modular units which are aligned to provide students with the academic profile to support progression into final year of university degree programmes. The courses focus on a blend of professional and academic criteria.

Course Duration:

- 18 Weeks Certificate course.
- 36 Weeks (1 year) Diploma courses.
- 72 Weeks (2-years) are the Advanced diploma courses.

== Admissions ==
The admission requirements vary by person to person and the college adopts a modern perception to it. Hove College attracts many university graduates and people with strong secondary education. However, there are strict entry requirements for English language skills for all overseas students, this is also in part to meet UKBA requirements for non EU/EEA. Overall the selection criteria are based on individuals merit, their work experience level of qualification and there motive for progression.

The college is a tier 4 sponsor that means non-EU resident can apply to study there.

== Accreditation ==
The college builds its own courses to match the job market which are then inspected and approved and accredited by Open College Network London Region 'OCN London' which is a national not for profit awarding body, listed and regulated by UK Ofqual. Hove College is also inspected and overseen by Independent school of Inspectorate and the college is also listed in the UK Register of Learning Providers. The college is officially recognized by UKBA and by Home Office as a private educational institution and is granted the tier 4 visa sponsor license which means non EU/EEA can apply for a study visa to study in the UK with Hove College.

== UK (Local) Partnership Agreements ==
Hove College and its course content is recognized nationally as a private college in the UK. However the college has special and close progression agreements with the listed universities to enroll its student in the final year of their bachelors, depending on the type of qualification they finished at the college and the grades obtained: Southampton Solent University and University of Brighton.

== International Partnerships ==
Hove College has an international agreement with their partner college in China, the Shanghai Culture & Creativity College (SCCC) and offers optional Shanghai placement for those at Hove College who want an international experience. The Shanghai Culture & Creativity College runs exactly the same programmes in China for its local students so it simplifies the study situation for Hove College students to transfer there for one module of their programme.

The college is a member of the Swedish SACO fair and attends and represents the college at the event.

== See also ==
- Universities in the UK
- Education in the UK
- Brighton and Hove
- University of Sussex
- Brighton and Hove City Council
- Bogus Colleges in the UK
