= Cambridge English Teaching Framework =

The Cambridge English Teaching Framework is a professional development framework, designed by Cambridge English Language Assessment, which is used by English language teachers to self-assess and plan their own development.

The framework describes four stages of a teacher's development (Foundation, Developing, Proficient and Expert) across five categories of teacher knowledge and skills:

1. Learning and the Learner
2. Teaching, Learning and Assessment
3. Language Ability
4. Language Knowledge and Awareness
5. Professional Development and Values.

Each category describes the key competencies for effective teaching at each stage of a teacher's development. The five categories are then divided into a number of components so that teachers can identify specific needs.

English language teachers use the framework to self-assess where they are in their career, decide where they want to go next, think about the knowledge and skills they would like to develop and identify the courses, qualifications and resources which will help them to progress.

== History ==
The Cambridge English Teaching Framework was designed to encapsulate the key knowledge and skills needed for effective teaching at different levels and in different contexts, and to show how Cambridge English Teaching Courses, Qualifications and professional development resources map to this core syllabus of competencies.

The framework was developed by experts at Cambridge English Language Assessment and validated by primary and secondary schools, private language schools and higher education providers around the world. During this validation stage, a group of teacher trainers were asked to match the framework competency statements to the different stages, in order to check whether the statements in the framework were placed at the correct stages. In addition, teachers around the world were asked to complete a questionnaire version of the framework. The teachers and their managers were then asked their opinion as to whether the framework had provided a fair assessment.

The first version of the framework was launched in April 2014 at the International Association of Teachers of English as a Foreign Language (IATEFL) conference. This first version had four categories, with Language Ability originally covered in the ‘Language Knowledge and Awareness’ category. However, ongoing research showed that English language ability needed to be given greater prominence, so a Language Ability category was added in the second version of the framework, launched in September 2014.

== Format ==
The Cambridge English Teaching Framework is a profiling grid, rather than a performance assessment tool. It is designed to show stages of a teacher's development at different points in time, rather than provide a profile of ‘a good teacher’. This approach recognises that teachers’ development is not only defined by their years of experience, but that most teachers’ development will be ‘jagged’. At any one time, teachers will be at different stages across each of the categories of teaching knowledge and skills.

On the horizontal axis of the profiling grid are four stages of teaching competence (Foundation, Developing, Proficient and Expert) and on the vertical axis of the grid are five categories of teaching knowledge and skills:

1. Learning and the Learner

This category looks at a teacher's understanding of key language learning theories and concepts, their awareness of different learning styles, and their ability to apply this understanding to plan and facilitate language learning.

2. Teaching, Learning and Assessment

This category looks at a teacher's ability to plan and manage language learning, make effective use of learning resources, understand teaching language systems and skills, and assess learning.

3. Language Ability

This category looks at a teacher's own language ability, their understanding of the language points taught at different levels of the Common European Framework of Reference for Languages (CEFR), and their ability to use language accurately and appropriately when interacting with learners and other teachers.

4. Language Knowledge and Awareness

This category looks at a teacher's understanding of key terms and concepts used to describe language, their use of strategies to check and develop their language awareness, and their ability to apply such knowledge practically in order to facilitate language learning.

5. Professional Development and Values

This category looks at understanding and practice in the areas of teacher learning, classroom observation, professional development and critical reflection.

Each category describes the key competencies for effective teaching at each stage of a teacher's development, as shown in the summary framework below. This summary version is for illustrative purposes only. Teachers should refer to the full competency statements or the Cambridge English Teacher Development Tracker when assessing their own development.

Cambridge English Teaching Framework: a summary

== Support ==
A free online tool is available for teachers to establish their current competency stage and identify their continuing professional development needs. The Cambridge English Teacher Development Tracker guides teachers through the framework categories with simple questions and a range of possible answers. Teachers can add other people (e.g. their managers or trainers) as reviewers. Reviewers can use the Tracker to compare the competency profiles of a number of teachers at the same time (e.g. to understand the skills profile of their whole team).

== Teaching courses, qualifications and resources ==
The Cambridge English Teaching Framework provides teachers with an overarching view of which Cambridge English Teaching Courses, Qualifications and resources correspond to each stage of a teacher's development.

Cambridge English Teaching Qualifications and Courses	Framework stage(s)
CELTA (Certificate in Teaching English to Speakers of Other Languages)	Foundation and Developing
YL Extension to CELTA (Young Learner Extension to CELTA)	Foundation and Developing
TKT (Teaching Knowledge Test)	Foundation and Developing
CELT-P (Certificate in English Language Teaching – Primary)	Foundation and Developing
CELT-S (Certificate in English Language Teaching – Secondary)	Foundation and Developing
Language for Teaching	Foundation, Developing and Proficient
ICELT (In-service Certificate in English Language Teaching)	Developing and Proficient
Delta (Diploma in Teaching English to Speakers of Other Languages)	Proficient and Expert
IDLTM (International Diploma in Language Teaching Management)	Proficient and Expert
Certificate in EMI Skills (English as a Medium of Instruction)	Proficient and Expert
Train the Trainer	Proficient and Expert

Most of the teaching qualifications and courses above straddle more than one stage of teaching competence on the framework. For example, some CELTA candidates start the course with some previous classroom experience and may already be at the Developing stage, whereas other candidates start the course with no previous teaching experience and will therefore be at the Foundation stage.

Candidates ending a course and obtaining a qualification may also straddle different stages. For example, TKT modules are awarded a band from 1 to 4. Candidates who achieve a band 4 result are more likely to be at the Developing stage than those who achieve a band 1 result.

In addition to these teaching qualifications, Cambridge University Press English Language Teaching (ELT) was consulted during the development of the framework, and their teaching methodology books and materials are being mapped to the framework to aid teachers in their development. The content on the online professional membership, Cambridge English Teacher, is also mapped to the stages and categories of the framework, so that teachers who know where they are on the teaching framework can easily find relevant courses and resources for each framework stage and category.

== Usage ==
English language teachers use the framework to self-assess and plan their own development. In addition, Directors of Studies and Heads of Departments may choose to use the framework as the basis for professional development discussions with their staff and to set professional development goals for them.

The framework is also being used by teacher training organisations, such as the Norwich Institute for Language Education (NILE), to develop and align their professional development courses for teachers.

Once teachers have identified where they are on the framework, they can access recommendations for development activities and free development resources via the Cambridge English website. There are recommendations for every stage of each category, providing teachers with suggested reading, videos and actions to incorporate into their teaching practice, along with professional development courses and qualifications.

== Research and development methodology ==
The first stage in the development of the framework was a review of existing CPD frameworks in the field, including:

Frameworks used in language education

- BALEAP Competency Framework for Teachers of English for Academic Purposes, UK (2008)
- British Council CPD Framework for Teachers of English, UK (2011)
- CAELA Framework for Professional Development, Center for Applied Linguistics, USA (2010)
- National Board for Professional Teaching Standards (NBPTS), USA (2010) 2nd ed.
- The European Association for Quality Services (EAQUALS) Profiling Grid (2013)

Frameworks used in general education

- Australian Professional Standards for Teachers (APST), Australian Institute for Teaching and Schools Leadership, Australia (2011)
- Competency Framework for Teachers (CFT), Departments of Education and Skills, Western Australia (2004)
- Framework for Teaching, Association for Supervision and Curriculum Development, USA (2008)
- Professional Standards for Teachers (PST), Department for Education, UK (2013).

The development of the Cambridge English Teaching Framework was also informed by Cambridge English Language Assessment's experience of developing teaching qualifications such as CELTA, Delta, ICELT and TKT. Data from teacher assessments, carried out as part of those qualifications, provided information about classroom practice and the processes that teachers use when planning and reflecting on their teaching, at different stages of their careers and in different contexts around the world. This evidence was used in designing the teaching framework, alongside an expert review of the CELTA, Delta and ICELT syllabuses and teaching education literature.

== See also ==
- Cambridge English Language Assessment
- CELTA
- Delta
- TKT
