= NOCN =

Current NOCN logo

The National Open College Network (NOCN), formerly known as the Open College Network (OCN), is a United Kingdom organisation developed to recognise informal learning achieved by adults.

== History ==
NOCN company logo and the 11 regional OCNs after being merged from 31 in 2005 and that existed until 2013

The first organisation of this type was created in 1981 in Manchester: the Manchester Open College Federation. Later as more organisations formed across the UK, the term Open College Network was adopted, each distinguished by its home geographical area.

By 2000, there were 31 OCNs that worked in collaboration with NOCN (National Open College Network) that had been setup in 1991 as a formal membership organisation for the regional OCN's. In 2005, the 31 OCNs were merged to form 11 larger OCNs (nine in England, one in Wales - now Agored Cymru - and one in Northern Ireland) with NOCN acting as an advocate with government.

The OCNs were the first accreditation bodies to use credit as the basis of the award system. Credit was established as the common currency for all OCNs and consistent definitions of four levels of achievement were established. The OCNs continue to offer credit-bearing courses and work-based learning programs, in various centres including schools, colleges, voluntary organisations, community centres, trades unions, prisons, training providers, and employers.

The OCNs in England and Wales are all Access Validating Agencies recognised by the Quality Assurance Agency for Higher Education (QAA) for award of Access to Higher Education diplomas.

In 2010/2011 all of the OCNs also became Awarding Organisations recognised by Ofqual. Some have adopted new, replacement names including Open Awards, Aim Awards, Apt Awards and Laser Learning Awards. Others, including OCN London, Open College Network West Midlands (previously OCNWMR), OCNER, OCNYHR, have retained their historic OCN title in their names.

In 2008, the Welsh OCN, Agored Cymru, ceased to be members of NOCN and in 2013 the majority of English OCNs decided not to renew their agreement with NOCN who had legally changed their company name from the National Open College Network.

In 2017, NOCN acquired CSkills from the Construction Industry Training Board (CITB), becoming one of the largest UK construction Awarding Organisations. The current NOCN Group also includes the organisations NOCN India Skills Foundation, NOCN Job Cards, CPCS, and NOCN Cymru.
