= LTCL DipTESOL =

English teaching qualification

The Licentiate Diploma in TESOL, also known as LTCL DipTESOL, is a professional qualification awarded in the teaching of English for Speakers of Other Languages (ESOL) by Trinity College London. It is an advanced teaching qualification, often seen as a follow-up to the CertTESOL, and is accredited in England by the Qualifications and Curriculum Authority at Level 7 on the UK National Qualifications Framework as are master's degrees in related subject areas. Holders of the LTCL DipTESOL are also eligible for credit transfer on some master's degree programs.

== History ==
Trinity College London has been running a Diploma syllabus for teachers of English as a foreign language since 1968. This was launched alongside major revisions to the Spoken English as a Foreign Language syllabus (a version of which was first introduced in 1937). The DipTESOL syllabus was last revised in 2005.

== About the Qualification ==
The Trinity Diploma in TESOL is intended for all teachers who have had at least two years’ full-time teaching experience either in their home country or elsewhere, whether English is the teacher’s first, second or foreign language. The award of the Trinity Diploma in TESOL indicates that the holder is considered by Trinity to be a fully competent and effective practising member of the TESOL profession. It is also an indication of the holder’s readiness to offer support to less experienced teachers. The holder of a Trinity Diploma in TESOL has demonstrated an established base of theoretical knowledge and practical ability, together with a commitment to further personal professional development, and can aspire to a range of positions combining management, training and teaching responsibilities

== Entry requirements ==
Candidates for the LTCL Diploma TESOL examinations must have:

- a degree or equivalent
- two years full-time ESOL teaching experience or equivalent over a longer period, amounting to a minimum of 960 teaching hours
- an initial formal TESOL training qualification is highly recommended, but not essential
- an awareness of, and interest in, language and have a high level of competence in English, in listening, speaking, reading and writing skills that is appropriate to fully qualified teachers of English and which will enable them to follow the course successfully
- an interest in, and aptitude for, the development of teaching ability at an advanced level with a wide range of learners, and the capacity for advanced study of the principles underlying language acquisition, learning and teaching

The selection procedure will include a written application form, a face-to-face or online interview with a validated course provider, and an interview written task, which must be in the applicant's own handwriting.

== Delivery ==
The course can be delivered as a full-time, face-to-face course, and should run for minimum of 10 weeks. It is also possible to deliver the course as a blended course with distance learning online and a face-to-face component. Candidates have a maximum of three years from first submission of assessment materials to complete the course in order to obtain the diploma.

== Assessment ==
The diploma is awarded upon successful completion of a course which includes four units. All components are monitored or examined by Trinity examiners.

=== Unit 1 - The written paper ===
Unit 1 consists of an externally assessed written paper in which the candidate is assessed on their knowledge of language, teaching and learning, and professional development. The written paper lasts for 3 hours.

=== Unit 2 - Coursework portfolio ===
Unit 2 is an internally assessed and externally moderated coursework portfolio, which consists of the following sections: Internally Assessed and Externally Moderated

- Section 1: Observation Instrument(s)

Rationale and Evaluation of use in a minimum of 6 hours (of 10 hours) compulsory observation

- Section 2: Developmental Record

Based on a minimum of 10 hours (of 15 hours) compulsory teaching

- Section 3: Independent Research Project

=== Unit 3 - Interview ===
Unit 3 consists of an externally examined interview, in which the candidate is required to display their knowledge of English phonetics and phonology, as well as issues relating to the teaching and learning of phonology. It consists of the following three sections:

- Section 1: Talk on a prepared topic with phonological focus and discussion (10 minutes)
- Section 2: Phonemic Transcription (5 minutes)
- Section 3: Discussion on topics concerning aspects of theory and practice of phonology teaching (15 minutes)

=== Unit 4 - Assessed teaching ===
Unit 4 is a teaching practice component that includes four internally assessed and externally moderated lessons, as well as one externally examined lesson. Candidates must complete lesson plans and reflections, as well as teach each lesson.

== Accreditation and comparison with other qualifications ==
The LTCL DipTESOL is accredited in the United Kingdom by the Qualifications and Curriculum Authority at NQF level 7, and is widely recognized by language schools around the world.

The LTCL DipTESOL and Delta are viewed internationally, and by major language teaching organizations such as the British Council, as equivalent qualifications.

== See also ==
- Delta (ELT) - An equivalent qualification provided by Cambridge ESOL
- CELTA
- Teaching English as a Foreign Language
- ESOL
- Applied Linguistics
