= TKT =

TKT could refer to:

- Teaching Knowledge Test, an English teaching qualification
- The Killing Tree, an American punk band
- Transketolase, a human enzyme and gene
- Tak Airport, Thailand (IATA:TKT)
- Kathoriya Tharu, spoken in India and Nepal (ISO 639-3:tkt)
- Tampereen Kisatoverit, a Finnish multi-sport club

== See also ==
- TKTS, ticket booths in New York City and London
