= Diploma in Teaching English to Speakers of Other Languages =

DELTA is an English language teaching (ELT) qualification for experienced Teachers of English as a Foreign Language (TEFL) and Teachers of English to Speakers of Other Languages (TESOL). It is provided by Cambridge English Language Assessment through authorised Cambridge English Teaching Qualification centres and can be taken either full-time or part-time. The full name of the course was originally the Diploma in English Language Teaching to Adults and is still referred to in this way by some course providers. However, in 2011 the qualification title was amended on the Ofqual register to the Cambridge English Level 7 Diploma In Teaching English to Speakers of Other Languages (DELTA) in order to reflect that the wider range of students that teachers might have, including younger learners.

Delta is designed for candidates with previous English language teaching experience. Candidates have usually completed an initial teaching qualification and typically have at least one year's teaching experience. It is suitable for first language and non-first language speakers of English who are teaching English as a second or foreign language (ESL and EFL) in primary, secondary and adult contexts. Candidates should have English language skills equivalent to at least level C1 of the Common European Framework of Reference for Languages.

Delta consists of three modules, which can be taken together or separately, in any order, and over any time period. Module Two requires course attendance at an authorised Delta centre so that teaching practice can be supported and assessed. There is no requirement to take a course at a recognised Delta centre for Modules One and Three, although most candidates do. Successful candidates receive a certificate for each module passed, as well as an overall certificate upon the successful completion of all three modules.

All three modules emphasise both theory and practice, although teaching practice is only directly assessed in Module Two. Delta also gives teachers an opportunity to pursue areas of specialism in Module Three (an extended assignment on syllabus design, course planning and assessment in the context of a selected ELT specialist area, or an extended assignment on ELT management in the context of a selected management specialist area).

Delta is designed to help candidates to develop as teachers and progress to new career opportunities. It is regulated at Level 7 of the Qualifications and Credit Framework for England, Wales and N. Ireland and is suitable for teachers at Developing or Proficient level on the Cambridge English Teaching Framework.

== History ==
Until 1988 the Royal Society of Arts (RSA) ran two English as a Foreign Language (EFL) diploma level programmes for native and non-native speaker teachers, the DTEFLA (Diploma in the Teaching of English as a Foreign Language to Adults) and the DOTE (Diploma for Overseas Teachers of English).

In 1988, Cambridge English Language Assessment (then known as the University of Cambridge Local Examinations Syndicate (UCLES)) reached an agreement with the RSA to take over its suite of teacher training courses and qualifications. UCLES integrated DTEFLA and DOTE to launch the Cambridge DELTA (Diploma of English Language Teaching to Adults).

In 2008 Delta was revised to its current format, making it suitable for all teaching age groups and divided into three free-standing modules, which can be combined to constitute the Diploma qualification.

The earlier formats of the qualification were equivalent in level to the current Delta qualification but were more narrowly focused on teaching general English (as a foreign language) to adult learners; whereas the current qualification is more broadly focused on teaching a wider range of learners with a variety of needs.)

The current qualification also has a more practical orientation. The written examination, which previously consisted of a number of essay questions, now uses pieces of data (such as samples of students’ work, authentic texts and published ELT materials) for analysis, comment and evaluation. Candidates of the current qualification are not required to write traditional academic essays.

== Admissions ==
Delta is suitable for experienced teachers, who have usually completed an initial teaching qualification, and have at least one year's ELT teaching experience in adult, primary or secondary teaching contexts. Delta modules may be taken by teachers, at any time during their career, who wish to:

- Refresh their teaching knowledge
- Review and update their practice
- Extend their expertise in a specialist area.

Teachers without an initial teacher training qualification and English language teaching (ELT) experience may be more suited to another qualification such as CELTA. Delta is suitable for teachers at Developing or Proficient levels of the Cambridge English Teaching Framework, whereas CELTA is designed for teachers mostly at Foundation level.

Delta candidates should have English language skills equivalent to at least level C1 of the CEFR – a standard of English which enables the teaching and understanding of language issues at a range of levels, from beginner to upper-intermediate students.

Although the modules are designed as a complementary set, candidates to do not have to take all three modules and can select and apply for a combination of modules according to need. Candidates wishing to enter for any, or all three, modules must register at an authorised Cambridge English Language Assessment examination or teaching qualification centre. Candidates wishing to enter Module Two are required to take Module Two at an authorised Delta centre. Centres have their own selection procedures for entry onto Module Two.

== Delta aims and main features ==
Delta is aimed at those wanting to update their teaching knowledge and improve their practice. It is designed to help candidates to:

- Extend knowledge and understanding of the principles and practice of English language teaching
- Critically examine current beliefs and practices as a teacher
- Apply new knowledge and understanding to a current teaching role
- Extend knowledge of English language teaching in contexts other than adult learners
- Develop their career and to apply for more senior roles.

Delta consists of three modules, each of which is separately assessed and certified. Achievement of a Pass in all three modules confers the status of a full Delta qualification. Candidates may choose to do any or all of the modules; there is no time limit for the completion of all three modules and there is no limit on the number of times a candidate can take a module.

The modular framework aims to provide an accessible professional development programme with flexible entry points. Candidates can take the modules in any order, although it is most practical to take them in order, as Modules Two and Three assume the candidate has knowledge and competencies gained in the previous module(s).

The three Delta Modules are:

Module One – Understanding language, methodology and resources for teaching

- This module focuses on the background to teaching and learning English in a range of ELT contexts

Module Two – Developing professional practice

- This module focuses on developing awareness and expertise in relation to the principles and professional practice of teaching English in a range of ELT contexts

Module Three – Option 1: Extending practice and English language teaching specialism or Option 2: English language teaching management.

- This module focuses on broadening candidates’ knowledge of a chosen specialism and developing understanding of syllabus design, testing and assessment (Option 1), or of ELT management (Option 2).

All three modules focus on both theory and practice, though teaching practice is only directly assessed in Module Two. Candidates have the opportunity to focus on a specialist area of teaching in Modules Two and Three. Candidates may either follow a course at a centre or prepare independently for Modules One and Three. Module Two requires course attendance at an approved Delta centre so that teaching can be supported and assessed. A Module Two course will involve 200 learning hours, including 100 tutor facilitated hours and 100 independent learning hours (reading and research and assignment preparation).

The course dates, fees, course format (e.g. face-to-face learning, distance learning) are determined by each centre. The exact nature of each course will vary from centre to centre, but all courses will cover the same content points, as set out in the Delta syllabus developed by Cambridge English Language Assessment.

== Course syllabus ==
The Delta syllabus includes three modules, which are assessed by a combination of exams, teaching practice and written coursework, and an extended essay.

- Module One: written exam
- Module Two: practical assessment and portfolio of coursework
- Module Three: extended essay

The following section outlines the main content points of each module. The full learning outcomes and indicative content are available in the course syllabus.

=== Module One – Understanding language, methodology and resources for teaching ===
Module One has six syllabus content points:

1. Theoretical perspective on language acquisition and language teaching
2. Different approaches and methodologies including current developments
3. Language systems and learners’ linguistic problems
4. Language skills and learners’ problems
5. Knowledge of resources, materials and reference sources for language learning
6. Key concepts and terminology related to assessment.

Module One is set at a postgraduate level (with 20 credit value). It is assessed through a written exam (externally marked) consisting of two 90-minute papers.

=== Module Two – Developing professional practice ===
Module Two has seven syllabus content points:

1. The language learner and the language learning context
2. Preparation for teaching English language learners
3. Evaluating, selecting and using resources and materials for teaching purposes
4. Managing and supporting learning
5. Evaluation of lesson preparation and teaching
6. Observation/Evaluation of other teachers’ lessons
7. Professionalism and opportunities for professional development.

Module Two is set at a postgraduate level (with 20 credit value). Assessment takes place during the course through assessed teaching practice, assignments and background essays as well as via a teaching practice assignment which is externally assessed by a Cambridge English assessor.

=== Module Three – Extending practice and ELT specialism (option 1) or ELT management (option 2) ===
Candidates have a choice of two options for Module Three:

- Option One: Extending practice and English language teaching specialism. This focuses on needs analysis, syllabus design, course planning and assessment in the context of a selected specialism (e.g. English for academic purposes, teaching exam classes, young learners, one-to-one teaching).
- Option Two: English language teaching management. This focuses on situation analysis and planning, and implementing change in the context of a selected management specialism.

Module Three is set at a postgraduate level (with 20 credit value). It is assessed through an externally marked extended assignment of 4,000 – 4,500 words focused on a chosen teaching specialism (Option 1) or a chosen ELT management specialism (Option 2).

Option One – Extending practice and ELT specialism

Option One has six syllabus content points:

1. Research into specialist areas
2. Syllabus design: principles, influences on, methodological effects of, and major syllabus types as applied to the specific learning context
3. Designing syllabus and teaching programmes to meet the needs of learners in the specific context of their selected specialism
4. Course design and development in the specific context of their selected specialism
5. The principles and practice of testing and assessment and application to the candidate's specialist area
6. Monitoring and evaluating the effectiveness and quality of courses and programmes of study.

Option Two – English language teaching management

Option Two has four syllabus content points:

1. Research into a chosen management specialism
2. Methods of situation analysis
3. Design of change proposals
4. Implementation of change proposals.

Candidates will need access to management data from a relevant language teaching context.

== Assessment ==
Assessment is conducted on a module-by-module basis.

=== Module One – Understanding language, methodology and resources for teaching ===
Module One has a written examination (externally set and marked), which consists of two 90-minute written papers with a 30-minute break between each paper (3 hours 30 minutes total). Paper 1 has five tasks, requiring labelling, short answer and longer written responses. Paper 2 has three tasks, requiring longer, written responses. All tasks are compulsory.

Paper 1 – total of 100 marks available

Task 1 (6 marks) has six definitions of ELT-related terms. Candidates supply the correct term for each definition.

Task 2 (12 marks) has four ELT terms. Candidates supply a definition and an appropriate example for each term.

Task 3 (12 marks) has a writing or speaking skills task from a published ELT course or exam material and a number of language features (e.g. ordering information, linking information, use of appropriate salutation) that learners would need to use to complete the activity successfully. Candidates identify three further appropriate language features which learners would need to use to complete the task.

Task 4 (20 marks) contains an authentic spoken (transcribed) or written text produced by a learner. Candidates identify a total of four strengths and weaknesses in the text based on specified areas, e.g. use of collocation, communicative success, cohesion.

Task 5 (50 marks) contains an authentic text, e.g. a newspaper article, a leaflet, a brochure, a form. Candidates identify features of the text which are typical of the genre and explain the form, meaning, use and phonological features of three different language items/areas highlighted in the text. For one of the areas, candidates may be asked to identify possible learner problems with form, meaning, use and pronunciation, as appropriate.

Paper 2 – total of 100 marks available

Task 1 (18 marks) contains an extract from or a description of a test, along with the context and purpose of its use. Candidates provide an evaluation of its effectiveness for the stated purpose, making six points.

Task 2 (42 marks) contains an extract from a published course book. In Part a, candidates identify the purpose of specified individual activities and stages in the material. In Part b, candidates identify how specified activities and stages in the material combine with those discussed in Part A. In Part c, candidates comment on key assumptions about language learning and skills development that are evident in some or all of the activities and stages.

Task 3 (40 marks) contains ELT-related input, e.g. from a methodology / resource book, lesson plan extract, transcript of teachers discussing a lesson, tutor feedback. Candidates answer specific questions about the material and discuss implications this view of teaching has for classroom practice. This could involve analysis of current and historical perspectives on approaches and methodologies, theories of language acquisition, resources, and learner and teacher roles. Candidates are marked on the points they make and on the depth of their answer.

=== Module Two – Developing professional practice ===
Module Two is assessed through five assignments:

- A two-part Professional Development assignment
- Two Language System assignments
- Two Language Skills assignments.

The assignments consist of written essays (2,000-2,500 words per essay) and for the Language System and Language Skills assignments: the planning, teaching and evaluation of a lesson. Assignments are completed throughout the course at intervals determined by the centre.

The Professional Development assignment and three of the Language Systems and Language Skills assignments are internally assessed by Delta course tutors. One of the Language Systems or Skills Assignments is externally assessed by a Cambridge English approved external assessor. Assessment of the lesson includes the candidate's evaluation of the lesson, which is sent to the assessor by the centre within 48 hours of the lesson taking place.

Professional Development assignment

This assignment has two parts:

- Part 1: Reflection and action (2,000-2,500 words). A reflective assignment worked on at different stages of the course.
- Part 2: Experimental practice (1,500-2,000 words). An investigation into an area of practice which is new for the teacher.

The assignment is based on an action plan developed at the start of the course and one observed lesson, which is a diagnostic observation of teaching that informs the rest of the programme.

The assignment aims to encourage teachers to reflect on their teaching and experiment with procedures, techniques, materials and resources. The assignment is completed during the course and includes observation and reflection on others’ teaching as well as tutor observation of the candidate's own teaching. The Experimental Practice can be set at any time during the course.

Language Systems assignments

The assignments consist of a background essay (2,000-2,500 words) exploring an area of language systems and related teaching and learning issues, and the planning, teaching and evaluation of a lesson related to the chosen area. Each of the two assignments must focus on a different area of language systems, e.g. grammar, lexis, phonology, discourse.

Language Skills assignments

The assignments consist of a background essay (2,000-2,500 words), with research and analysis of an aspect of language skills and related teaching and learning issues, and the planning, teaching and evaluation of a lesson related to the chosen area. One of the assignments must focus on a productive skill (speaking or writing) and the other assignment must focus on a receptive skill (reading or listening).

=== Module Three – Extending practice and ELT specialism (option 1) or ELT management (option 2) ===
Module Three is assessed through an Extended Assignment (4,000-4,500 words excluding appendices).

Option 1: Extending practice and ELT specialism

Candidates carry out an independent investigation, leading to the design of a course programme related to their chosen specialist area. Candidates can select one of the following specialisms:

- Business English
- Teaching young learners or young adults (age group with 5-year range, e.g. 8-13, 14-19)
- English for Specific Purposes (ESP)
- English for Academic Purposes (EAP)
- Teaching examination classes
- Teaching one-to-one
- ESOL learners with literacy needs
- CLIL / Embedded ESOL
- Teaching monolingual classes
- Teaching multilingual classes
- Teaching in an English-speaking environment
- Teaching in a non-English speaking environment
- Teaching learners online / through distance or blended learning
- Teaching English to learners with special requirements, e.g. visual / hearing impairment, dyslexia
- Language development for teachers
- Language support, e.g. mainstream teaching programmes, specialist skills support.

Candidates can narrow down their specialist area to research a particular aspect in appropriate depth. For example, English for Special Purposes could be narrowed down to: Teaching communication skills to doctors working in a general hospital.

Assignments should cover the following five categories in the mark scheme (total marks available 140):

- Grasp of topic (maximum 35 marks) – review of relevant literature; understanding of key issues; application of knowledge to practice.
- Needs analysis and comments (maximum 28 marks) – key principles of needs analysis and diagnostic testing; analysis of the diagnostic test and identification of learner needs; discussion and justification of priorities.
- Course proposal (maximum 35 marks) – key principles of syllabus and course design; justification of learning aims, teaching approach and the course in terms of learner needs; design of course.
- Assessment (maximum 28 marks) – key principles of different types of assessment; justification of assessment procedures in terms of course design and learner needs; application of assessment procedures.
- Presentation and organisation (maximum 14 marks) – academic writing, language and referencing; presentation, coherence and organisation; clarity of argument and quality of ideas.

Option 2: ELT management

Candidates research a chosen ELT Management specialism, leading to the design of a change proposal and implementation plan to overcome issues identified in their analysis. Candidates select one of the following specialisms:

- Academic management
- Human resource management
- Customer service
- Marketing

Candidates can narrow down their specialist area to research a particular aspect in appropriate depth. For example, Human resource management could be narrowed down to: Staff development.

Assignments (4,000-4,500 words in total) should cover the following five categories in the mark scheme:

- Introduction: review and key issues (max 1,200 words) – rationale for the choice of specialism and review of the key issues including literature review, general ELT management principles and specific principles relating to the chosen specialism
- Situation analysis and commentary (max 1,000 words) – analysis of the language teaching operation and how the results of this analysis were used to clarify the areas requiring attention
- Proposal and justification (max 1,200 words) – discussion of the content and structure of the proposed changes in relation to the key issues and principles discussed in Part 1 and the priorities for improvement identified in Part 2
- Implementation (max 900 words) – explanation of how the proposed change will be implemented and why (with reference to relevant literature) accompanied by a detailed action plan
- Conclusion (max 200 words) – consideration of how the proposal is linked to the key issues outlined in the introduction.

== Results ==
Candidates receive a certificate for each module. Achievement of a passing grade in all three modules confers the status of a full Delta qualification for which candidates receive an overall certificate on request.

For each module there are three passing grades: Pass with Distinction; Pass with Merit; and Pass.

Pass with Distinction

- Module One – awarded to candidates who demonstrate comprehensive and accurate knowledge, a high level of familiarity with the full range of ELT/ESOL concepts, theories and practices and, show a high level of insight in their analysis
- Module Two – awarded to candidates who, receive a distinction in the externally assessed lesson, with a minimum of a pass for the external Background essay, a merit or distinction for the submitted internally assessed lesson, with a minimum of a pass for the Background Essay and a pass for the professional development assignment (PDA)
- Module Three – awarded to candidates producing an excellent piece of work which shows a very high level of understanding, analysis and application, and which displays originality and critical insight.

Pass with Merit

- Module One – awarded to candidates who demonstrate comprehensive and generally accurate knowledge, a high level of familiarity with a wide range of ELT/ESOL concepts, theories and practices and, show a good level of insight in their analysis
- Module Two – awarded to candidates who, receive a merit in the externally assessed lesson, with a minimum of a pass for the external Background essay, a pass or merit for the submitted internally assessed lesson, with a minimum of a pass for the Background Essay and a pass for the professional development assignment (PDA)
- Module Three – awarded to candidates producing a very good piece of work which shows a high level of understanding, analysis and application, and which displays some originality and critical insight.

Pass

- Module One – awarded to candidates who demonstrate generally accurate knowledge, a sound level of familiarity with a range of ELT/ESOL concepts, theories and practices and, show a good level of insight in their analysis
- Module Two – awarded to candidates who, receive a pass in both parts of the externally assessed lesson, a pass for both parts of the submitted internally assessed lesson, and a completed professional development assignment (PDA)
- Module Three – awarded to candidates producing a satisfactory piece of work which shows an acceptable level of understanding, analysis and application, and which meets the requirements of the assignment.

Candidates who fail to meet criteria in any assessed components will receive a Fail. Although candidates are required to have experience and to demonstrate aptitude before beginning the course, a substantial minority of candidates (just over a quarter) fail Module One. For Modules Two and Three, less than 3% of candidates' performances are graded as a "fail" but about one sixth of candidates are given a "referral" and cannot pass unless they successfully resit the assessment.

Candidate results are sent by Cambridge English Language Assessment to the centre two months after the completion of a module. A certificate is then sent to centres one month after a candidate has received their results.

== Course delivery format ==
Delta courses can be taken full-time or part-time and either face-to-face, online or using distance learning (NB: the Teaching Practice component of Module Two must be conducted in a face-to-face environment). All versions of Delta lead to the same internationally recognised certificate.

Full-time courses, conducted face-to-face in an authorised Teaching Qualification centre typically last seven to twelve weeks (depending on the centre). Part-time courses, conducted face-to-face in an authorised Teaching Qualification centre, can last anything from a few months to up to 18 months (depending on the centre).

Delta is available in many different countries around the world. A directory of global Cambridge English teaching qualification centres and their contact details can be accessed on the Cambridge English Language Assessment website.

=== Distance learning ===
Candidates can take the Delta modules through distance learning programmes, which combine both face-to-face and online learning. This means that teachers who do not have access to a local Cambridge English Teaching Qualifications centre can also take Delta courses.

== Usage ==
Delta aims to improve teaching practice, support career development and preparation for more senior roles. The UK Office of Qualifications and Examinations Regulation (Ofqual) regulates all three Delta modules at Level 7 of the Qualification and Credit Framework (QCF) for England, Wales and N. Ireland – the same level as a master's degree or a professional diploma in the European Union.

Delta can facilitate progression to other qualifications, such as MAs in Teaching English as a Foreign Language (TESOL), with some MA programmes accepting Delta credits. Examples of Higher Education Institutions which offer credits or exemptions to Delta holders include:

- Aston University
- Institute of Education, University of London
- King's College London
- Norwich Institute for Language Education (NILE) in partnership with University of Chichester
- Sheffield Hallam University
- University College London (UCL)
- University of Bath
- University of Derby
- University of Exeter
- University of Manchester
- University of Nottingham
- University of Reading
- University of Warwick.

Delta is accepted around the world by educational institutions, employers and international English Language teaching organisations. International ELT organisations that recognise Delta include organisations such as: British Council overseas teaching centres; International House and Bell Educational Services.

== Preparation ==
Free preparation materials, including a past exam paper and examination report, are available from the Cambridge English Language Assessment website

=== Cambridge English Teacher ===
Delta candidates receive a free 1-year membership of Cambridge English Teacher along with their final certificate. Cambridge English Teacher provides continuous professional development for English language teachers and is run by two departments of the University of Cambridge: Cambridge English Language Assessment and Cambridge University Press.

== See also ==
- Cambridge English Language Assessment
- CELTA
- TKT (Teaching Knowledge Test)
- LTCL DipTESOL - An equivalent qualification provided by Trinity College London
- CertTESOL
- Cambridge English Teaching Framework
