= CertTESOL =

Professional qualification for teaching English as a foreign language

The Certificate in TESOL (CertTESOL) is an accredited professional qualification awarded in the teaching of "English for speakers of other languages" (ESOL) by Trinity College London. It is a commonly taken teaching qualification in the field of English language learning and teaching (ELT). It is one of various TEFL qualifications available. The Trinity CertTESOL is regulated by the UK's Office of Qualifications and Examinations Regulation (Ofqual) which regulates qualifications, examinations and assessments in England.

== About the qualification ==
The Trinity CertTESOL is designed for those with little or no experience in teaching English. It provides the basic skills and knowledge needed to take up a first post as an ESOL teacher. The program also gives an introduction to theory and an insight into the challenges facing the learner and the role of the teacher. It is also suitable for those with classroom experience but without any formal TESOL training or qualifications.

The qualification is awarded upon passing a course that includes supervised and observed teaching practise, written assignments and an interview with an external moderator. The CertTESOL is accredited in the United Kingdom by the Qualifications and Curriculum Authority at Level 5 on the UK National Qualifications Framework.

== Extension certificates ==
=== Teaching Young Learners Extension Certificate (TYLEC) ===
The Trinity TYLEC module is intended for already qualified teachers—particularly those with pre-existing CertTESOL certificates. Its aim is to instruct ESL teachers on how to correctly teach English as a foreign language to children and teens (Ages 7–16).

The TYLEC is roughly equivalent to the now discontinued Cambridge CELTA-YL extension.

=== Certificate for Practising Teachers (CertPT) ===
The Trinity CertPT is for teachers seeking to update, improve and enrich their professional teaching practice. It draws upon qualified TESOL teachers’ existing knowledge of teaching practice and theory while promoting the acquisition and refinement of the specialist skills needed to develop and use effective teaching resources.

The CertPT is an Ofqual level 6 qualification.

== Availability ==
The Trinity CertTESOL is available in many different countries throughout the world, and some institutions offer a portion of the course in the form of distance learning. The course can be taken part-time over several months to a year, or full-time in a four- or five-week period. The largest Trinity College London Certificate in TESOL provider outside of Europe is English for Asia in Hong Kong. English for Asia's website is www.hongkongtesol.com

Trinity CertTESOL and DipTESOL courses in India are offered by Cochin International Language Academy -CILA, Kerala. CILA is the only provider of both CertTESOL (OFQUAL LEVEL 5) and LTCL DipTESOL (OFQUAL LEVEL 7) courses in India. CILA runs full-time face-to-face and online courses and part-time online courses throughout the year.

Experienced teachers can further their career by taking a more advanced diploma, the LTCL DipTESOL. This is often seen as a follow-up to the CertTESOL or Cambridge CELTA.

== Admission requirements ==
The Trinity CertTESOL is open to all those for whom English is a first, second or foreign language. Your own use of spoken and written English will need to be of an appropriate standard for you to be a role model of English for your learners and help them understand the nature of the language. The validation guidelines set out the requirements - these include a minimum age of 18 and evidence of qualifications achieved for entry to higher education in the UK (A levels) or equivalent.

Educationalist Jason Anderson offers useful advice about the Trinity CertTESOL course choice and admissions.

== Comparative qualifications ==
The Trinity CertTESOL, as per CELTA, is recognized and accepted by the British Council as an initial TESOL qualification for teachers in its accredited teaching organisations in the UK and in its own teaching operations overseas. Both have at least one hundred hours of instruction and six hours of supervised teaching practice.

Similarly, the LTCL DipTESOL, as per DELTA, is accredited in the UK at Level 7 on the National Qualifications Framework, as are postgraduate diploma, a.k.a. PGDip.

== Assessment ==
The Trinity College London does not award merit or distinction in the CertTESOL course. The qualification is only awarded to successful trainees on a pass/refer/fail basis.
