= West London College (1977–2017) =

College of further and higher education in London, England, now closed

Coordinates: 51.5190°N 0.1539°W

- Active: 1977–2017
- Parent institution: British Study Centres
- Location: London, United Kingdom

West London College (WLC) was an independent college of further and higher education specialising in the arts, design and fashion sectors. located on Manchester Street in the Mayfair and Marylebone district of Central London. The College was part of the British Study Centres Group of Colleges which included British Study Centres School of English, and Hove College. It had 400 enrolled students before its closure in 2017. The name and trademark were transferred to West London College, the trading name of Ealing, Hammersmith and West London College, in 2017.

== History and location ==
The College had its roots in correspondence schooling from the 1930s onwards. From 1992 until 2015, the College offered courses in business, finance, marketing, accountancy, computing, tourism and hospitality and had teaching premises located near Selfridges in Mayfair. Additionally, in 2004 it took over the former training facility of Marks and Spencer in Manchester Street, called Hannah House which the College occupied with its sister school, British Study Centres School of English. The College was an Approved Learning Partner of Heriot-Watt University since 1992, offering tuition for Bachelors and master's degrees. From 2012 to 2015, it was designated as the London Associate Campus of Heriot-Watt University. Hostel accommodation was provided for students in the Bayswater and Notting Hill areas of central London.

The college stopped enrolling new students and closed down in 2017. The building was then used by Wetherby Preparatory.

== Accreditation ==
West London College had been awarded Premier Membership of Study UK, a status reserved only for those independent colleges that have successfully undertaken a full British university Quality Assurance inspection and been duly authorized to run British university degree courses under official licence. The College held a UKVI Tier 4 Sponsor's Licence. West London College was subject to educational oversight by the Quality Assurance Agency for Higher Education (QAA) under the UKVI's Tier 4 sponsorship requirements. West London College was affiliated with British Study Centres and Hove College.

== University partnership ==
West London College delivered courses either under licence or in partnership with the University of the Arts London (UAL), Heriot-Watt University, the University of Greenwich and Bournemouth University.
