= Certificate in Teaching English to Speakers of Other Languages =

Teacher training qualification

CELTA is an initial teacher training qualification for teaching English as a second or foreign language (ESL and EFL). It is provided by Cambridge Assessment English through authorised Cambridge English Teaching Qualification centres and can be taken either full-time or part-time. CELTA was developed to be suitable both for those interested in Teaching English as a Foreign Language (TEFL) and for Teaching English to the Speakers of Other Languages (TESOL). The full name of the course was originally the Certificate in English Language Teaching to Adults and is still referred to in this way by some course providers. However, in 2011 the qualification title was amended on the Ofqual register to the Cambridge English Level 5 Certificate In Teaching English to Speakers of Other Languages (CELTA) in order to reflect the wider range of students that teachers might have, including younger learners.

CELTA is designed for candidates with little or no previous English language teaching (ELT) experience. It is also taken by candidates with some teaching experience who have received little practical teacher training or who wish to gain internationally recognised qualification. Candidates should have English language skills equivalent to at least C1 of the Common European Framework of Reference for Languages (CEFR) or an IELTS score of 7.

CELTA gives equal emphasis to theory and practice. The strong practical element demonstrates to employers that successful candidates have the skills to succeed in the classroom. Courses can be taken full-time or part-time through one of three modes of delivery: fully face-to-face, in a blended format that combines on-line self-study with practical teaching experience, or fully online, with teaching practice and input all being delivered online through a video conferencing platform such as Zoom. A full-time, face-to-face course typically lasts between four and five weeks. CELTA is a continuous assessment course (i.e. participants are assessed throughout the course) leading to a certificate qualification.

Candidates who successfully complete the course can start working in a variety of English language teaching contexts around the world. CELTA is regulated at Level 5 of the Qualifications and Credit Framework for England, Wales and N. Ireland and is suitable for teachers at Foundation and Developing level on the Cambridge English Teaching Framework.

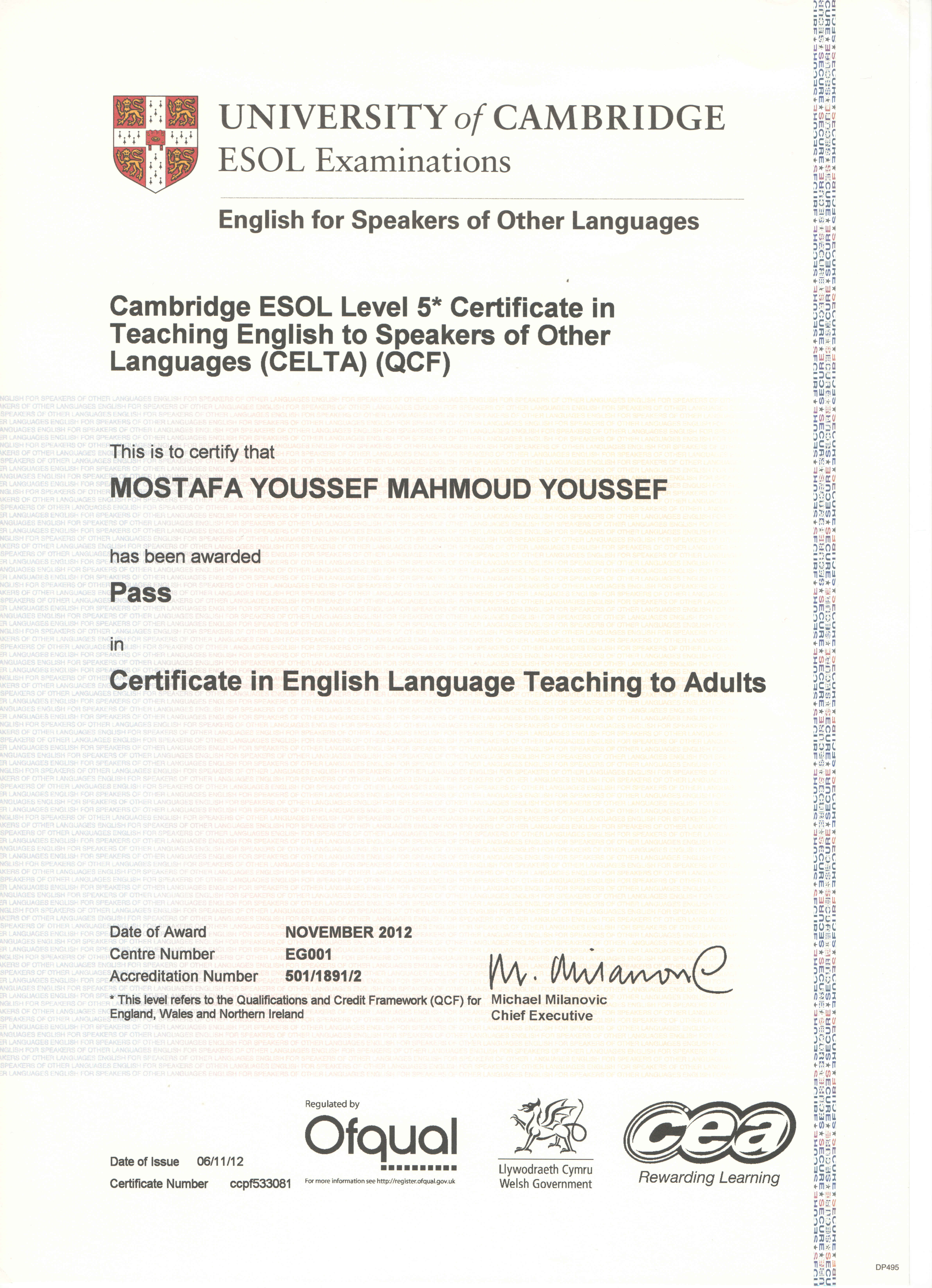
Cambridge CELTA certificate

== History ==
A certificate course for the teaching of English as a foreign language (TEFL) originated in International House London in 1962 and was run from the 1970s until 1988 by the Royal Society of Arts (RSA). The 100 hour course at International House led to the RSA Preparatory Certificate in Teaching English as a Foreign Language to Adults (RSA PrepCertTEFLA).

In 1988, Cambridge English Language Assessment (then known as the University of Cambridge Local Exam Syndicate or UCLES) reached an agreement with the RSA to take over the running of training courses for teachers of English as a foreign language (TEFL).

The qualification was amended in response to perceived needs, leading to the launch in September 1988 of the CTEFLA (the Certificate in Teaching English as a Foreign Language to Adults). By 1996, the CTEFLA became the RSA/Cambridge CELTA and in 2001 it was known simply as Cambridge CELTA.

In 2011, Cambridge English Language Assessment and IH London co-operated to launch a jointly produced online blended CELTA course: CELTA Online.

== CELTA for teachers of adult learners ==
CELTA focuses on teaching adult learners, but many of the skills and techniques apply to teaching young learners as well. Candidates who plan to teach mainly young learners could take the Young Learner Extension to CELTA, after completing Celta until 2010 when Young Learner Extension ceased to exist.

== Course admissions ==
CELTA is suitable for candidates who are beginning their career and experienced teachers who have received little practical teacher training or who wish to gain an international certification of their ELT skills. Teachers who already have an initial teacher training qualification, and who have at least one year’s English Language Teaching experience, may be more suited to another qualification such as Delta. CELTA is suitable for teachers at Foundation and Developing level on the Cambridge English Teaching Framework, whereas Delta is designed for teachers at Proficient and Expert levels of the framework.

CELTA applicants are required to have English language skills equivalent to at least level C1 of the CEFR – a standard of English that enables the teaching and understanding of language issues at a range of levels, from beginner to upper-intermediate students.

CELTA applicants should be over the age of 18 and ideally, have a standard of education equivalent to that required for entry into higher education (e.g. high school diploma or A-Levels). Applicants without formal qualifications may be accepted if they can demonstrate that they are likely to complete the course successfully.

Applicants are asked to complete a written task. The task will focus on language awareness and consideration of issues related to teaching English. If the written task demonstrates an appropriate level of English and the potential to develop the skills needed to pass the course, the applicant will be invited to an interview.

The nature of the interview varies from centre to centre. It may be an individual interview or a group interview and may be conducted face-to-face, on the telephone or on Skype. The interview is an opportunity for centres to provide information to candidates, as well as to assess candidates’ potential to successfully complete the course (i.e. candidates will be asked to show how they think about language and learning/teaching English).

The average cost of taking a CELTA course around the world is about USD 2,000.

== Course aims and main features ==
CELTA is an initial teacher training qualification designed to help candidates acquire and improve the skills needed for teaching English, with an emphasis on hands-on teaching practice. The official course aims are as follows.

The course enables candidates to:

- Acquire essential subject knowledge and familiarity with the principles of effective teaching
- Acquire a range of practical skills for teaching English to adult learners
- Demonstrate their ability to apply their learning in a real teaching context.

CELTA programmes are designed by individual centres using the syllabus and course aims provided by Cambridge English Language Assessment.

The syllabus consists of five topic areas:

- Topic 1 – Learners and teachers, and the teaching and learning context
- Topic 2 – Language analysis and awareness
- Topic 3 – Language skills: reading, listening, speaking and writing
- Topic 4 – Planning and resources for different teaching contexts
- Topic 5 – Developing teaching skills and professionalism.

The exact nature of the programme will vary from centre to centre. Programmes may also vary year on year to reflect changes in technology and teacher training methodology. However, all courses will have a minimum of 120 contact hours and will include the following components:

- Input
- Supervised lesson planning
- Teaching practice (six assessed hours)
- Feedback on teaching
- Peer observation
- Observation of experienced teachers (minimum six hours)
- Consultation time.

Candidates are expected to dedicate an additional 80 hours for required reading, research, pre- and post-session tasks, assignments and lesson preparation.

== Course syllabus ==
The CELTA syllabus consists of five topic areas, which are each assessed through a combination of teaching practice and written assignments. The following section outlines the main content points covered in each topic – the full Learning Outcomes are available in the course syllabus.

Topic 1 – Learners and teachers, and the teaching and learning context

Topic 1 has six syllabus content points:

- 1.1 Cultural, linguistic and education backgrounds
- 1.2 Motivations for learning English as an adult
- 1.3 Learning and teaching styles
- 1.4 Contexts for learning and teaching English
- 1.5 Varieties of English
- 1.6 Multilingualism and the role of first languages.

Topic 1 is assessed through teaching practice (planning and teaching) and a written assignment focused on the learner and learning contexts: ‘Focus on the learner’.

Topic 2 – Language analysis and awareness

Topic 2 has seven syllabus content points:

- 2.1 Basic concepts and terminology used in English language teaching to discuss language form and use
- 2.2 Grammar – grammatical frameworks: rules and conventions relating to words, sentences paragraphs and texts
- 2.3 Lexis – word formation, meaning and use in context;
- 2.4 Phonology – the formation and description of English phonemes and the feature of connected speech
- 2.5 The practical significance of similarities and differences between languages
- 2.6 Reference materials for language awareness
- 2.7 Key strategies and approaches for developing learners’ language knowledge.

Topic 2 is assessed through teaching practice (planning and teaching) and a written assignment focused on an aspect of the English language system: ‘Language related tasks’.

Topic 3 – Language skills: reading, listening, speaking and writing

Topic 3 has five syllabus content points:

- 3.1 Reading (basic concepts and terminology, purposes, decoding meaning and potential barriers);
- 3.2 Listening (basic concepts and terminology, purposes, features, potential barriers)
- 3.3 Speaking (basic concepts and terminology, features, language functions, paralinguistic features, phonemic systems)
- 3.4 Writing (basic concepts and terminology, sub-skills and features, stages of teaching writing, beginner literacy, English spelling and punctuation)
- 3.5 Teaching (key strategies and approaches for developing learners’ receptive and productive skills).

Topic 3 is assessed through teaching practice (planning and teaching) and a written assignment focused on an aspect of language skills: ‘Language skills related tasks’ .

Topic 4 – Planning and resources for different teaching contexts

Topic 4 has five syllabus content points

- 4.1 Principles of planning for effective teaching of adult learners of English
- 4.2 Lesson planning for effective teaching of adult learners of English
- 4.3 Evaluation and lesson planning
- 4.4 The selection, adaption and evaluation of materials and resources in planning (including computer and other technology based resources)
- 4.5 Knowledge of commercially produced resources and non-published materials and classroom resources for teaching English to adults.

Topic 4 is assessed through teaching practice (planning and teaching) and a written assignment focused on classroom teaching and the identification of action points: ‘Lessons from the classroom’.

Topic 5 – Developing teaching skills and professionalism

Topic 5 has nine syllabus content points:

- 5.1 The effective organisation of the classroom
- 5.2 Classroom presence and control
- 5.3 Teacher and learner language
- 5.4 The use of teaching materials and resources
- 5.5 practical skills for teaching at a range of levels
- 5.6 The monitoring and evaluation of adult learners
- 5.7 Evaluation of the teaching/learning process
- 5.8 Professional development responsibilities
- 5.9 Professional development support systems.

Topic 5 is assessed through teaching practice (planning and teaching) and a written assignment focused on classroom teaching and the identification of action points: ‘Lessons from the classroom’.

== Course delivery format ==
CELTA courses can be taken full-time or part-time and either face-to-face, online or a combination of these modes (NB: Since the COVID outbreak of 2020, the Teaching Practice component and therefore the entire course, can be taken 100% online). All versions of CELTA give equal emphasis to theory and practice (candidates generally spend half their time learning theory and half their time doing teaching practice). All versions of CELTA lead to the same internationally recognised certificate.

Full-time courses, conducted face-to-face or online by an authorised teaching qualification centre, last four to five weeks (depending on the centre). Part-time courses, conducted face-to-face in an authorised teaching qualification centre, last anything from a few months up to a year.

A directory of global Cambridge English teaching qualification centres and their contact details can be accessed on the Cambridge English Language Assessment website.

=== CELTA online blended ===
CELTA Online is provided by Cambridge English Language Assessment in partnership with International House, London. It provides a flexible manner of obtaining CELTA by combining online self-study with face-to-face teaching practice. The online materials can be accessed at any time allowing students to plan their course work around other professional / personal commitments.

The online course is conducted over a minimum of ten weeks and maximum of an academic year. Each online course has a minimum of three and a maximum of 24 candidates.

The online self-study units have interactive materials, tasks and discussion forums. Candidates work independently or collaboratively on these tasks with support, evaluation and comment from an online tutor. The teaching practice elements of the course take place at an authorised teaching qualification centre with face-to-face contact. Candidates teach for a total of six hours (spread over a minimum of eight occasions) with peers observing.

== Young Learner (YL) Extension to CELTA (Discontinued) ==
The Young Learner (YL) Extension to CELTA was aimed at teachers who had gained the CELTA certificate and wished to build on the content of CELTA to teach young learners (i.e. children and teenagers). The YL Extension to CELTA was normally taught full-time over the course of two weeks.

However, registration for the YL extension was phased out in December 2016. Instead, Cambridge English recommends taking the "TKT: Young Learners" module as an alternative to the YL extension.

== Assessment and results ==
CELTA does not have a final exam. It is a continuous assessment course (i.e. participants are assessed throughout the course), which leads to a certificate. An external assessor, appointed by Cambridge English Language Assessment, moderates each course.

Candidates are required to attend their course and fulfil the following course requirements:

- Teach classes of the relevant age group and size, for a total of six hours over at least eight occasions. Candidates will teach classes at two levels of ability (one of which will be lower than intermediate and the other at intermediate level or higher).
- Observe experienced teachers teaching classes of language for a total of six hours (three of which may be via video link), as well as observing other candidates in the practice group
- Submit a portfolio of coursework, including:
  - Materials related to teaching practice
  - Four written assignments (NB: two assignments can be conflated into one larger assignment if all the assessment criteria are met).

The CELTA certificate is awarded to candidates who meet the course requirements and whose performance meets, or exceeds, the criteria in the two assessment components:

- Teaching Practice (TP) – 6 hours
- Written Assignments – 4 assignments.

Each centre designs their own written assignments. Assignment should be between 750 and 1,000 words and should consist of:

- One assignment focused on the learner and learning contexts
- One assignment focused on an aspect of the English language system
- One assignment focused on an aspect of language skills
- One assignment focused on classroom teaching and the identification of action points.

There are three passing grades: Pass (Grade A), Pass (Grade B), and Pass.

Candidates who fail to meet criteria in any or all assessed components will receive a Fail. The application and interview process is intentionally rigorous to ensure candidates have the potential to pass the course and the failure rate is therefore not high. Candidates who fail will receive a letter confirming the result and an end of course report which states their areas of achievement and areas for further development. In order to pass, candidates will need to re-take the course and meet all the criteria.

== Usage ==
CELTA is one of the most widely taken English Language Teaching qualifications with over 316 approved CELTA centres, in over 60 countries, providing over 850 CELTA courses every year.

CELTA is recognised around the world by international English Language Teaching organisations, public bodies, non-governmental organisations, educational institutions, publishers and English Language Teaching quality assurance bodies, including:

- The UK Office of Qualifications and Examinations Regulation (Ofqual): CELTA is regulated at Level 5 of the Qualifications and Credit Framework for England, Wales and N. Ireland
- IATEFL (the International Association of Teachers of English as a Foreign Language)
- TESOL International Association
- TESL Canada
- Languages Canada
- NEAS Australia
- The Irish Department of Education and Skills
- The National Qualifications Authority of Ireland (NQAI)
- Accreditation and Coordination of English Language Services (ACELS).

International English Language Teaching organisations that recognise CELTA include:

- British Council
- ELS Language Schools.

Higher education institutions that recognise and/or provide CELTA includes universities based in:

- Australia (e.g. University of Queensland)
- Ireland (e.g. University College Cork)
- New Zealand (e.g. University of Auckland)
- UK (e.g. Swansea University, University of Bristol, University of Durham, University College London)

At Swansea University, for example, the CELTA is offered both to external applicants and as an embedded course to undergraduates as part of their studies in the College of Arts and Humanities

- U.S. (e.g. University of Texas.)

== Preparation ==
Candidates accepted on to a CELTA course are provided with a reading list of suitable materials and a pre-course task. The pre-course task is an introduction to English language teaching, which provides candidates with information about methodology and language analysis. Additionally, candidates receive access to Cambridge English Teacher where further materials and professional development courses can be accessed.

=== Cambridge English Teacher (Discontinued) ===
As of July 2013, all CELTA candidates receive a 1-year membership of Cambridge English Teacher. This has been discontinued since May 2017. However, resources for Teacher Development are available on the Cambridge English website. Cambridge English Teacher provides continuous professional development for English language teachers and is run by two departments of the University of Cambridge: Cambridge English Language Assessment and Cambridge University Press.

It is an online resource that supports career development by providing short courses, webinars with experts, articles and videos, teaching resources, a global network of thousands of teachers, a Jobs Board and a calendar of events (online and face-to-face).
