= OCN London =

UK awarding body for qualifications

- Other names: Open College Network London Region
- Motto: Making Learning Matter
- Type: Non for Profit
- Established: 1980s
- Affiliations: Ofqual & QAA
- Director: Carlos Cubillo-Barsi
- Location: 70 Gracechurch Street, London, EC3V 0HR, United Kingdom
- Language: English
- Colours: Illuminated Blue and Dark Purple
- Website: www.ocnlondon.org.uk/about-us.aspx

OCN London is a UK national not-for-profit awarding body organisation that creates and awards qualifications. OCN London stands for Open College Network London Region, however it is popularly known as 'OCN London' in the UK. The awarding body collaborates in partnership with educators, training providers, charities and employers. They have been assisting numerous private and public organisations for over 35 years. The organisation focuses practical academic needs for non traditional learners and paves their way to higher education in the UK.

== Accreditation & recognition ==
The Awarding Body is nationally recognized and it also runs its own courses. The awarding body courses are accredited, approved and recognized by Ofqual and QAA. Given the Awarding Body has Ofqual regulated status. The UK qualification provider is also recognized in the international stage and its qualifications can be compared, evaluated and recognized to foreign equivalency.

=== University partnership ===
OCN London and London South Bank University have a formal partnership agreement signed in 2015.

London South Bank University (LSBU) and OCN London formalized an existing partnership, where LSBU staff participated in OCN London panels to validate Access to HE Diploma courses. LSBU staff have also served on the OCN London Advisory Board and have participated on the board of trustees.

=== Board of trustees ===
Tracy Ferrier, who is the Head of Skills for the British Council, is one of the board members for OCN London.

== OCN London Accredited Providers ==
- Aylesbury College
- Barnet and Southgate College
- College of North West London
- Croydon College
- Epping Forest College
- Hope UK
