= Teaching Knowledge Test =

The Teaching Knowledge Test, or TKT, is a professional credential that focuses on core teaching concepts for teachers of English as a foreign language. The British Council explains that the TKT "is a test of the skills you need to be successful in teaching English to speakers of other languages". Moreover, it is a rigorous and internationally accepted qualification, administered by a recognized exam board that proves language-teaching abilities.

The TKT assessment tests and demonstrates that those who pass are:

1. familiar with different teaching methodologies
2. know how to use teaching resources effectively
3. understand key aspects of lesson planning
4. can use different classroom management methods for different needs.

TKT assessment takes the form of a multiple choice test, made up of three core modules, which can be taken together, or separately in any order.

The three core modules are:

1. Language and background to language learning and teaching
2. Lesson planning and use of resources for language teaching
3. Managing the teaching and learning process.

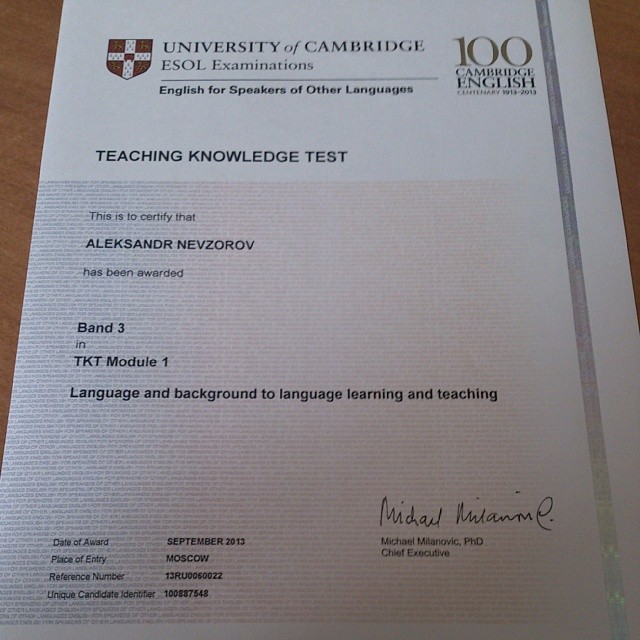
TKT Certificate
