= 2001 =

2001 in various calendars
- Gregorian calendar: 2001; MMI
- Ab urbe condita: 2754
- Armenian calendar: 1450; ԹՎ ՌՆԾ
- Assyrian calendar: 6751
- Baháʼí calendar: 157–158
- Balinese saka calendar: 1922–1923
- Bengali calendar: 1407–1408
- Berber calendar: 2951
- British Regnal year: 49 Eliz. 2 – 50 Eliz. 2
- Buddhist calendar: 2545
- Burmese calendar: 1363
- Byzantine calendar: 7509–7510
- Chinese calendar: 庚辰年 (Metal Dragon); 4698 or 4491 — to — 辛巳年 (Metal Snake); 4699 or 4492
- Coptic calendar: 1717–1718
- Discordian calendar: 3167
- Ethiopian calendar: 1993–1994
- Hebrew calendar: 5761–5762
- Hindu calendars
- Vikram Samvat: 2057–2058
- Shaka Samvat: 1922–1923
- Kali Yuga: 5101–5102
- Holocene calendar: 12001
- Igbo calendar: 1001–1002
- Iranian calendar: 1379–1380
- Islamic calendar: 1421–1422
- Japanese calendar: Heisei 13 (平成１３年)
- Javanese calendar: 1933–1934
- Juche calendar: 90
- Julian calendar: Gregorian minus 13 days
- Korean calendar: 4334
- Minguo calendar: ROC 90 民國90年
- Nanakshahi calendar: 533
- Thai solar calendar: 2544
- Tibetan calendar: ལྕགས་ཕོ་འབྲུག་ལོ་ (male Iron-Dragon); 2127 or 1746 or 974 — to — ལྕགས་མོ་སྦྲུལ་ལོ་ (female Iron-Snake); 2128 or 1747 or 975
- Unix time: 978307200 – 1009843199

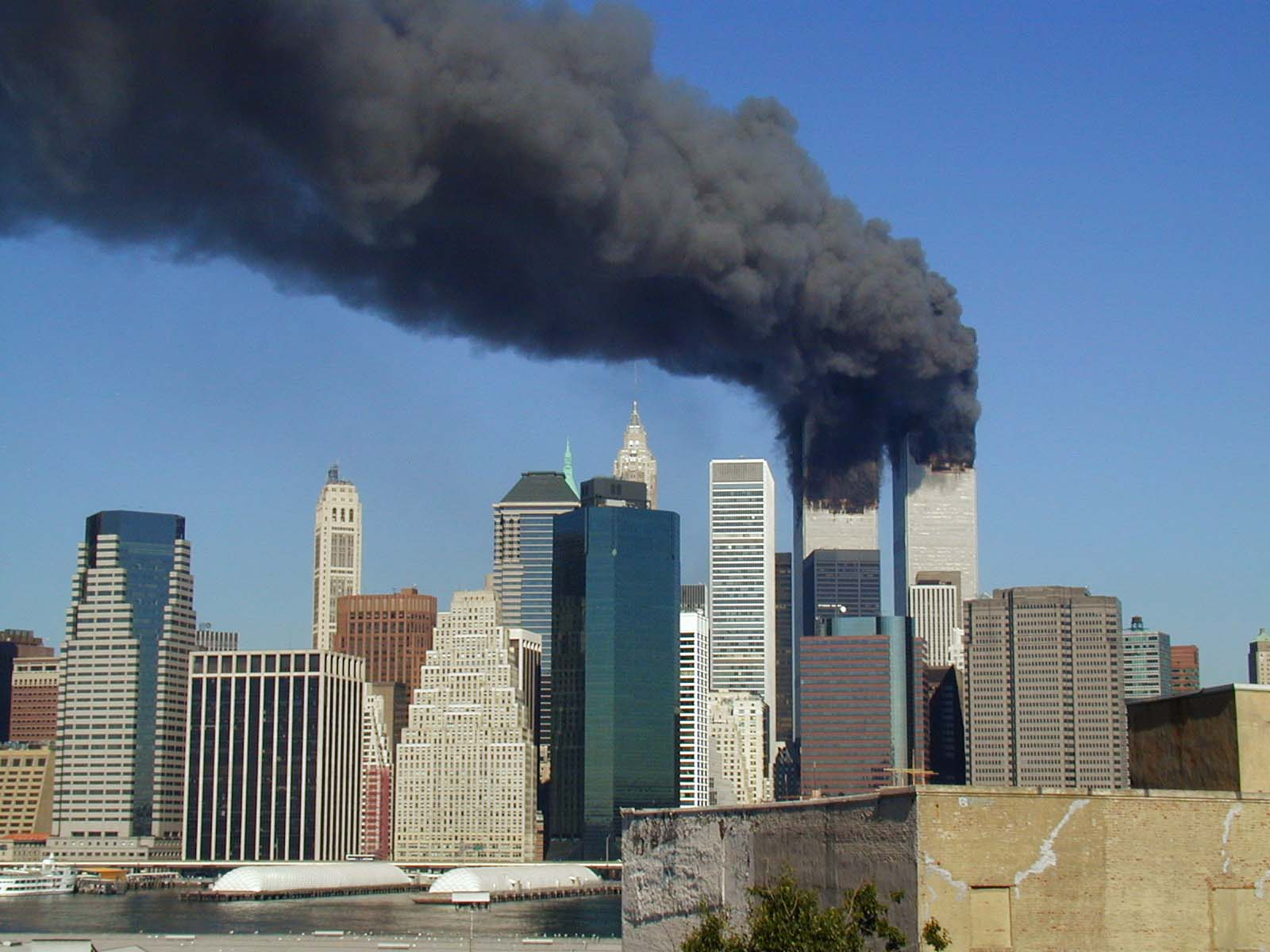
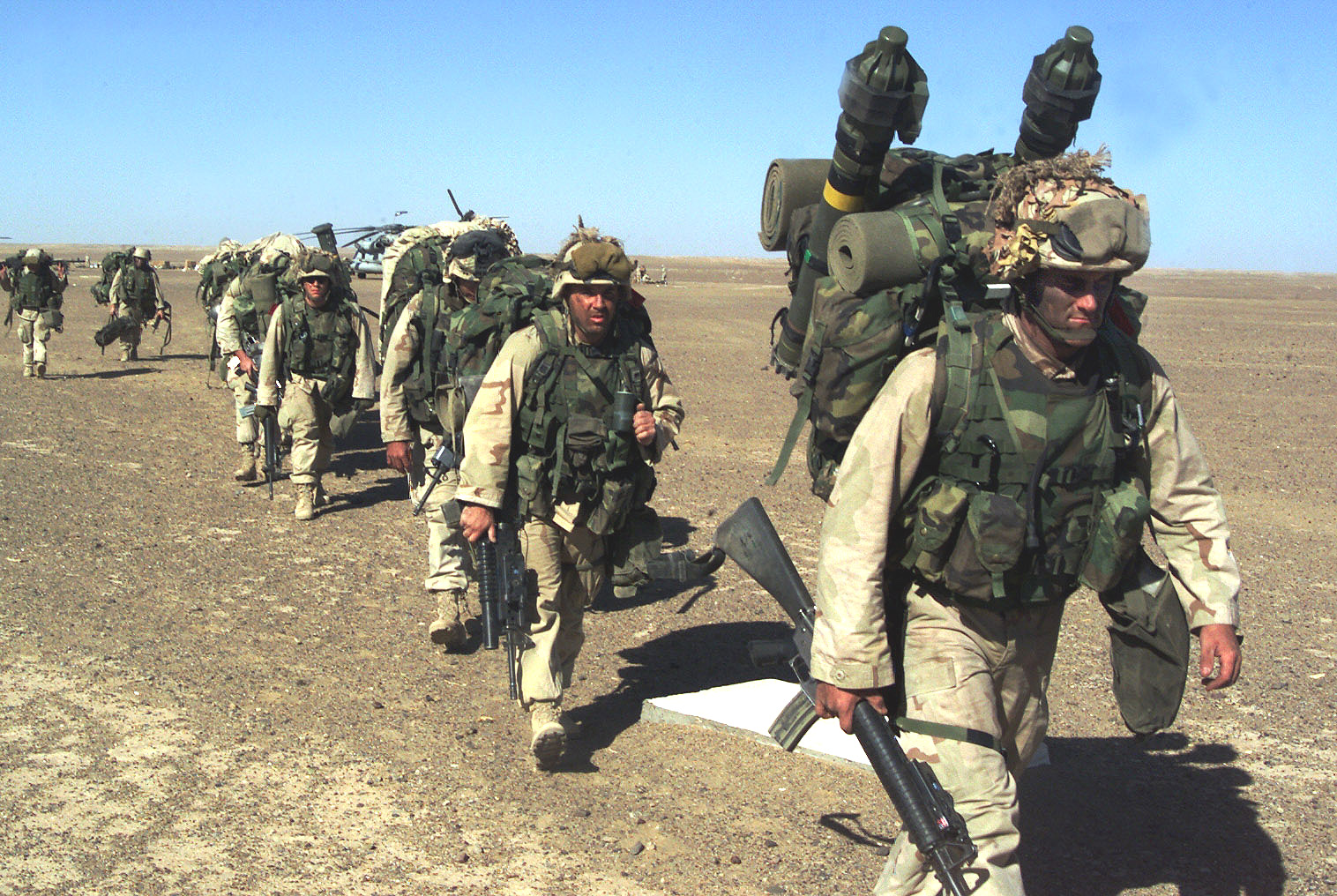
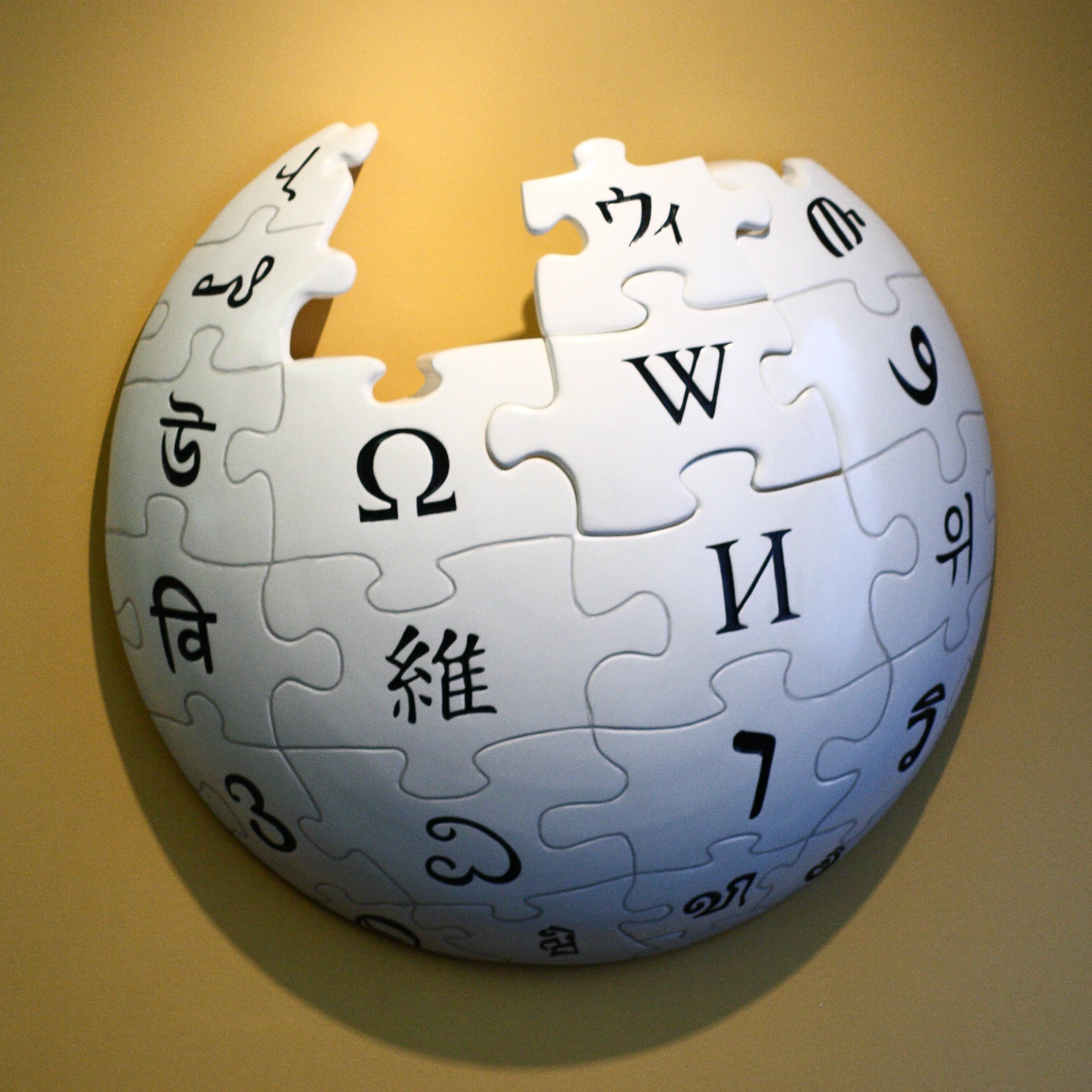
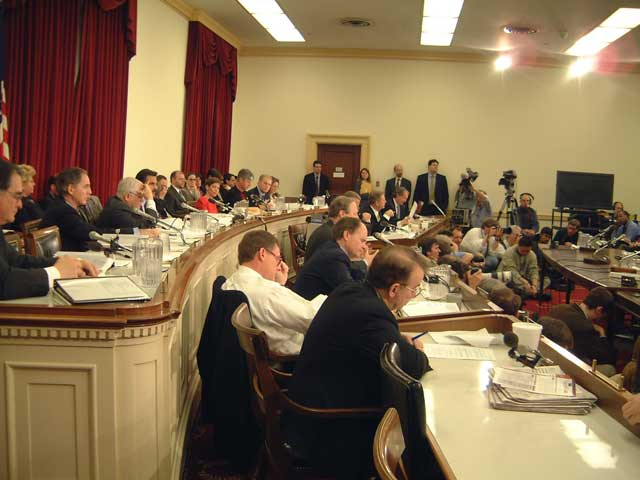
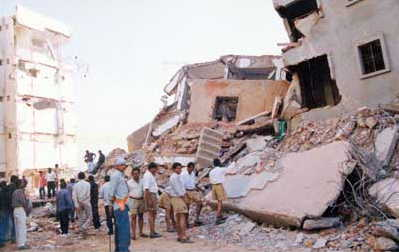
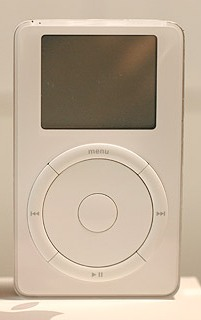
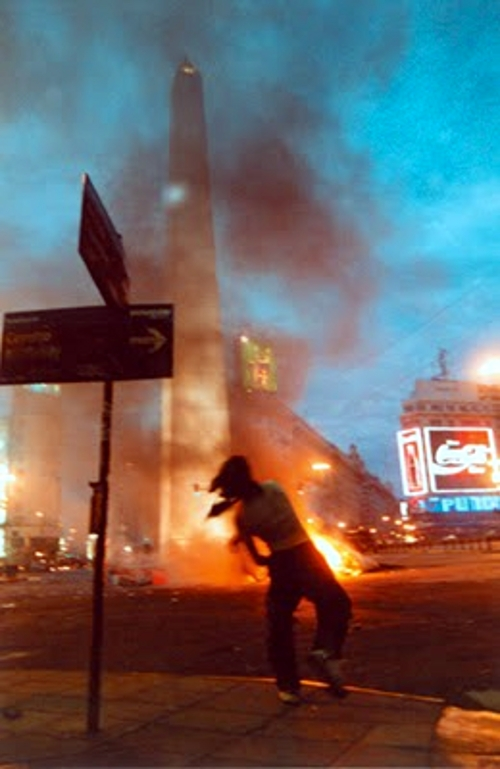
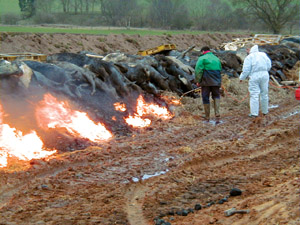
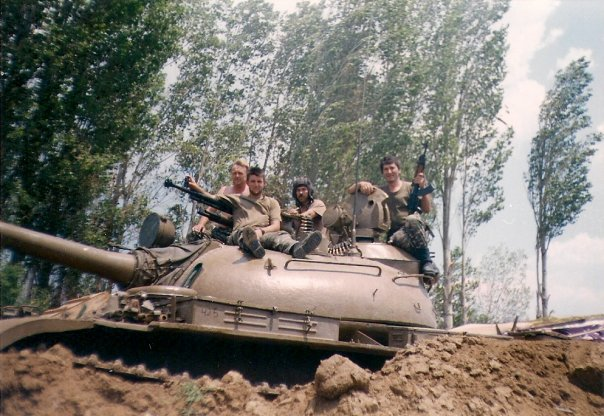
From top to bottom, left to right: the September 11 attacks kill nearly 3,000 and trigger the war on terror; the War in Afghanistan begins as U.S. led forces strike al-Qaeda and the Taliban; Wikipedia launches, reshaping access to knowledge; the Enron scandal exposes corporate fraud; the 2001 Gujarat earthquake kills tens of thousands in India; Apple unveils the first iPod, revolutionizing digital music; the December 2001 riots in Argentina erupt amid economic collapse; the 2001 United Kingdom foot-and-mouth outbreak devastates agriculture; Albanian insurgents initiate a conflict in Macedonia, the last of the Yugoslav Wars.

2001 (MMI) was a common year starting on Monday of the Gregorian calendar, the 2001st year of the Common Era (CE) and Anno Domini (AD) designations, the 1st year of the 3rd millennium and the 21st century, and the 2nd year of the 2000s decade.

2001's most prominent event was the September 11 attacks against the United States by al-Qaeda, which killed 2,977 people and launched the global war on terror. The United States led a multi-national coalition in an invasion of Afghanistan after the Taliban government was unable to extradite Al-Qaeda leader Osama bin Laden within 24 hours. Other international conflicts in 2001 were the standoff between India and Pakistan as well as the Second Intifada between Israel and Palestine. Internal conflicts began in Macedonia, in the Central African Republic, and in Guinea. Political challenges or violent conflicts caused changes in leadership in Argentina, the Democratic Republic of the Congo, Indonesia, Nepal, and the Philippines.

2001 was the second warmest year on record at the time, which was amplified by the end of a years-long La Niña phase. The Atlantic and Pacific tropical storm seasons were both more active than usual. The deadly Bhuj Earthquake took place in Gujarat, India on January 26, while the strongest earthquake in 36 years took place in Peru on June 23. A potential health crisis occurred when a major outbreak of foot-and-mouth disease spread among British livestock, bringing about the deaths of millions of animals. Four hominid species were described or proposed, and several major archaeological finds took place, including a set of terracotta citizens near the Terracotta Army. The pygmy three-toed sloth was also first described in 2001. The year had the fewest successful orbital spaceflights since 1963, with eight crewed missions. Successes in space exploration included the landing of NEAR Shoemaker on an asteroid and the arrival of 2001 Mars Odyssey on Mars.

Politics and religion in the final months of 2001 focused intently on the Muslim world and Islamic terrorism after the September 11 attacks. The Catholic Church was active in 2001, as Pope John Paul II went on several goodwill trips to meet with non-Catholic religious groups and investigations of sexual abuse cases among the church's priests began. Former Yugoslav president Slobodan Milošević was arrested and became the first head of state to be charged with crimes against humanity by an international body. The 27th G8 summit took place in Genoa and was met by 200,000 protestors. 2001 took place during a minor recession among developed and developing nations, with only middle income nations avoiding an economic downturn. The recession saw economic crises take place in Argentina and in Turkey. American energy company Enron and the European airlines Sabena and Swissair all ended operations in 2001. In popular culture, the Harry Potter and The Lord of the Rings film franchises were launched, the iPod and iTunes were invented for music, and three major sixth-generation video game systems became available. The Mac OS X and Windows XP operating systems were launched, as was the Wikipedia project.

== Population ==
The world population on January 1, 2001, was estimated to be 6.190 billion people and increased to 6.272 billion people by January 1, 2002. An estimated 133.9 million births and 52.1 million deaths took place in 2001. The average global life expectancy was 66.8 years, an increase of 0.3 years from 2000. There were approximately 12 million global refugees in 2001. 500,000 were settled over the course of the year, but about the same number of people were displaced in other locations, causing the number of refugees to remain largely unchanged. The largest sources of refugees were from Afghanistan and Macedonia. The number of internally displaced persons decreased from 21.8 million to 19.8 million in 2001, with the most affected areas being Afghanistan, Colombia, and Liberia.

== Conflicts ==
There were 34 conflicts that resulted in at least 25 fatalities in 2001. Ten resulted in at least 1,000 fatalities: the Afghan Civil War, the invasion of Afghanistan, the Algerian Civil War, the Angolan Civil War, the Burundian Civil War, the Colombian conflict, the Second Chechen War in Russia, the Rwandan insurgency during the Second Congo War, Eelam War III in Sri Lanka, and the Second Sudanese Civil War. The majority of conflicts took place in Africa and Asia: 14 occurred in Africa and 13 occurred in Asia. Four new armed conflicts emerged in 2001: the insurgency in Macedonia, the attempted coup in the Central African Republic, the United States invasion of Afghanistan, and the entry of Sierra Leone's Revolutionary United Front into the RFDG Insurgency in Guinea. The Sierra Leone Civil War was the only conflict that ended in 2001.

=== Internal conflicts ===
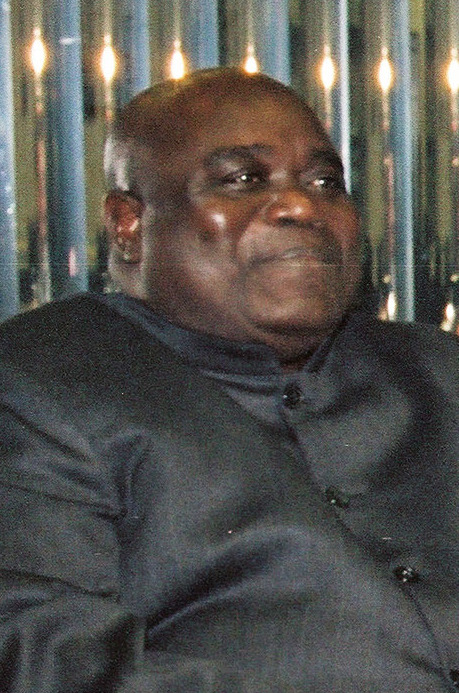
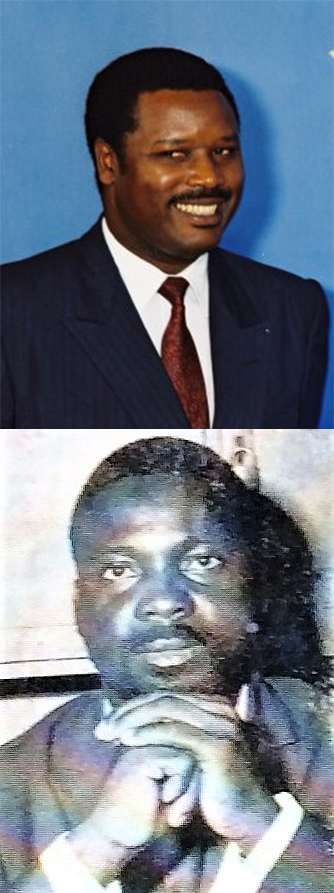
DRC President Laurent-Désiré Kabila (left) was assassinated on January 16. Burundi President Pierre Buyoya (top) and CAR President Ange-Félix Patassé both faced coup attempts.

The Second Congo War continued with the assassination of President Laurent-Désiré Kabila on January 16. The 1999 ceasefire was mostly respected by the government and the various rebel groups, and United Nations ceasefire monitors established a presence throughout the year. The Algerian Civil War, the Angolan Civil War, and the Burundian Civil War all saw continued fighting between governments and rebels in Africa. The latter began the peace process through a provisional government on November 1. The Second Sudanese Civil War between the ruling National Islamic Front and various other groups escalated in 2001. This included a sub-conflict, the War of the Peters, which continued into 2001 until a ceasefire was negotiated in August.

Two failed coup attempts took place in 2001: a group of junior officers sought to overthrow President Pierre Buyoya in Burundi while he was out of the country on April 18, and André Kolingba, a former president of the Central African Republic, led a military coup against his successor Ange-Félix Patassé on May 28, causing several days of violence.

Several conflicts continued in Indonesia, though the insurgency in Aceh between the Indonesian government and the Free Aceh Movement was the only one to see widespread violence in 2001, as the war significantly escalated after the end of a ceasefire and breakdown of peace talks. The New People's Army rebellion saw two ceasefires between the Philippine government and the New People's Army, separated by a brief surge of heavy fighting after the assassination of a member of parliament. A ceasefire was also established with the nation's other insurgent group, the Moro Islamic Liberation Front. In Myanmar, the Karen conflict continued, and the insurgency of the Shan State resumed hostilities after a temporary peace in 1999. The Tamil Tigers declared a ceasefire and requested peace talks during the Eelam War III in Sri Lanka, but hostilities resumed on April 25, and the Tamil Tigers launched several suicide attacks in July, including the Bandaranaike Airport attack. The Nepalese Civil War also saw increased hostilities in 2001.

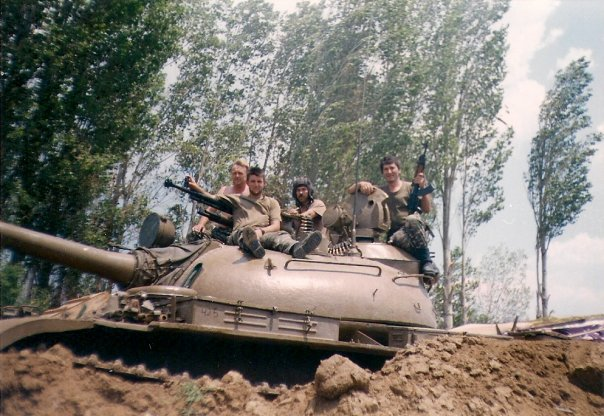
Macedonian soldiers during the Battle of Aračinovo

The only major conflict in Europe was the Second Chechen War between the Russian government and the separatist Chechen Republic of Ichkeria. Russian forces controlled the republic's population centers, but Chechen forces continued to use guerrilla warfare. Macedonia saw a smaller scale conflict between the Macedonian government and the National Liberation Army (NLA), which sought reform for the status of Albanian people in Macedonia. The deployment of NATO peacekeeping forces to Macedonia was authorized on August 21. Yugoslavia similarly saw an insurgency by Albanian rebels, but the conflict did not escalate. The only major conflict in South America was the Colombian conflict between the Colombian government and various far-left and far-right groups. The United Self-Defense Forces of Colombia expanded into Ecuador in 2001 and carried out attacks on Ecuadorian citizens.

=== International conflicts ===
The 2001–2002 India–Pakistan standoff was the only conflict between two national governments in 2001. The territorial dispute over the region of Kashmir consisted primarily of small scale attacks by militant groups until two attacks on Indian legislature buildings: one in October and one in December. The latter provoked a major escalation of troop deployments with preparations for a major war.

The Second Intifada continued from the previous year between Israel and Palestine. The conflict escalated into an undeclared war in which Palestinian militants targeted Israeli civilians with weapons and suicide bombers with the Israeli military responding with fighter jets and missile strikes against Palestinians. Every ceasefire ended within a day of its establishment.

==== September 11 attacks and invasion of Afghanistan ====
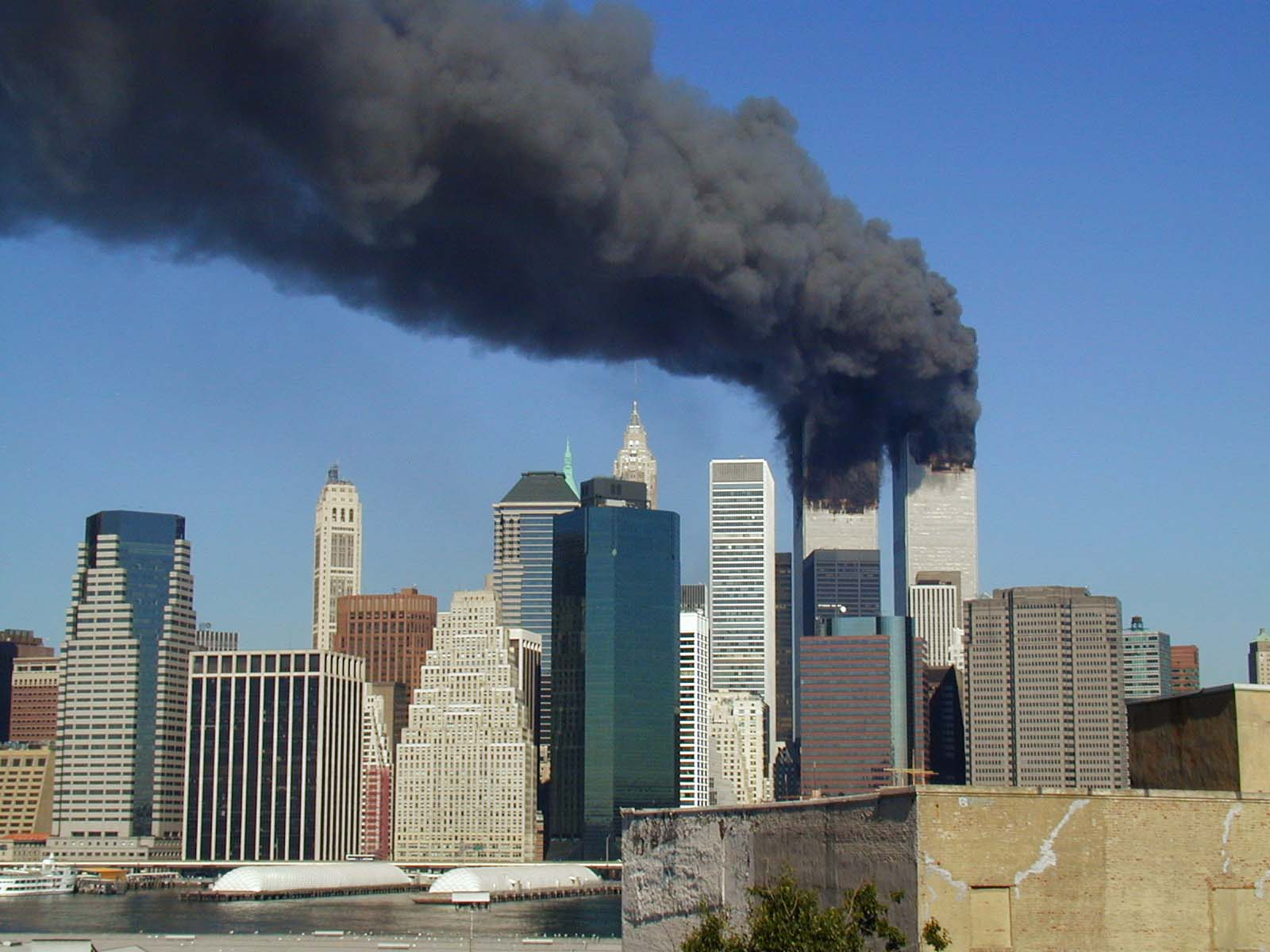
The September 11 attacks were a defining event of the year 2001.

The September 11 attacks were carried out by Al-Qaeda when 19 terrorists hijacked four commercial airplanes and crashed two of them into the World Trade Center, one into the Pentagon, and one near Stonycreek Township, Pennsylvania. 2,977 people were killed; the attacks and the subsequent global war on terror are widely recognized as events that defined 2001. This was internationally recognized as an armed attack against the United States under the UN charter, and NATO invoked Article 5 of the North Atlantic Treaty for the first time in its history.

The Afghan Civil War between the de jure Northern Alliance government and the de facto Taliban government continued from previous years. When the Taliban refused to extradite Al-Qaeda leader Osama bin Laden, the United States led a multi-national coalition in an invasion of Afghanistan on 7 October. The American-led coalition and the Northern Alliance captured Afghan cities until the Taliban surrendered to the Northern Alliance in Kandahar on December 6. The American-led coalition attacked the Al-Qaeda headquarters in Tora Bora in December, but Al-Qaeda's leadership had gone into hiding. An interim government of Afghanistan led by Hamid Karzai was formed on December 22.

== Culture ==
=== Architecture ===
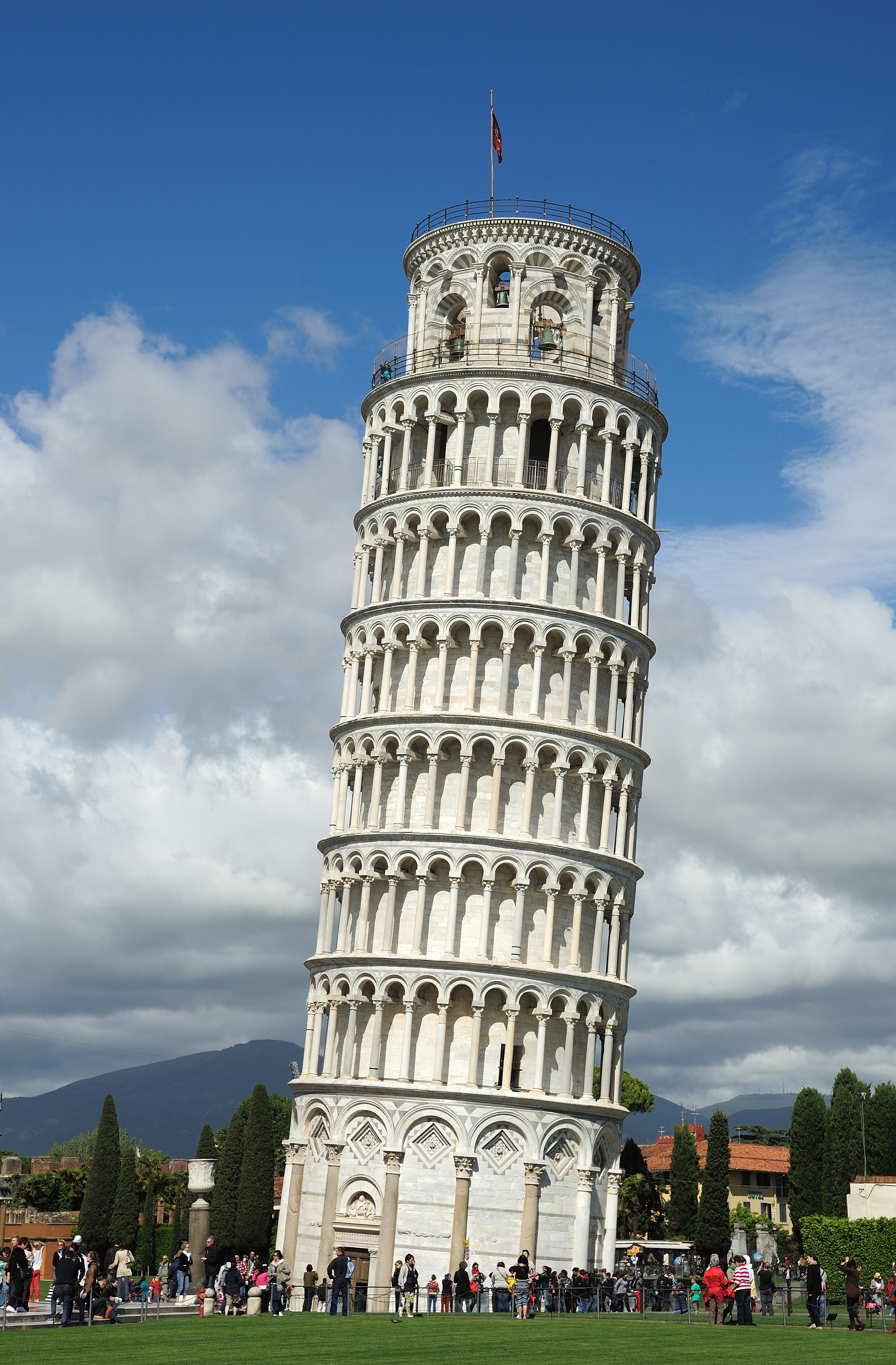
The Leaning Tower of Pisa reopened in 2001.

New buildings constructed or opened in 2001 include the Bibliotheca Alexandrina in Alexandria, the Sendai Mediatheque in Sendai, the DG Bank building in Berlin, and Aurora Place in Sydney. Museums that opened in 2001 include the Jewish Museum Berlin designed by Daniel Libeskind, the National Museum of Australia designed by Howard Raggatt in Canberra, the Changi Chapel and Museum in Singapore, the Neue Galerie New York, and the Apartheid Museum in Johannesburg.

Prominent renovations made in 2001 include the Queen Elizabeth II Great Court in the British Museum and the entrance wing of the Milwaukee Art Museum. Preservation efforts were also completed on the Leaning Tower of Pisa, and it reopened to the public on December 15 after 12 years of reconstruction. Damaged and destroyed buildings included the World Trade Center buildings which were destroyed in the September 11 attacks, and the Biblioteca Gallardo in El Salvador, which was destroyed in an earthquake.

=== Art ===
The 49th Venice Biennale shifted from traditional paintings and sculptures, giving an increased focus to film and architectural sculpture. Avant-garde works of art sold well, with the highest earning being Gerhard Richter's painting of candles, which sold for US$5.4 million. A decline in the fashion industry was exacerbated by the September 11 attacks; styles with military or otherwise violent iconography were phased out.

Improvements in inkjet printing made high resolution photography more practical. Japanese photographer Hiroshi Sugimoto exhibited his photographs of wax statues of historical figures to provoke questions about the nature of artistic depiction. Several iconic works of photojournalism were produced during the September 11 attacks, including The Falling Man and Raising the Flag at Ground Zero. Fritz Koenig's Sphere was the only artwork to be recovered from the site, and the sculpture continued to be displayed in its damaged form as a memorial.

The most popular exhibition at the Metropolitan Museum of Art in New York City was artwork depicting Jacqueline Kennedy's time as first lady of the United States, followed an exhibition of works by Johannes Vermeer and the Delft School. Both exhibitions were seen by over 500,000 visitors. New art galleries and museums opened in Tokyo, Vienna and New York.

=== Media ===
The highest-grossing films in 2001 were Harry Potter and the Philosopher's Stone, The Lord of the Rings: The Fellowship of the Ring, Shrek and Monsters, Inc. The highest-grossing non-English-language film was Studio Ghibli's Spirited Away (Japanese), the 15th highest-grossing film of the year. The inaugural entries in the Harry Potter and Lord of the Rings film franchises brought fantasy into mainstream culture, popularizing young adult novels and catering to fandom communities.

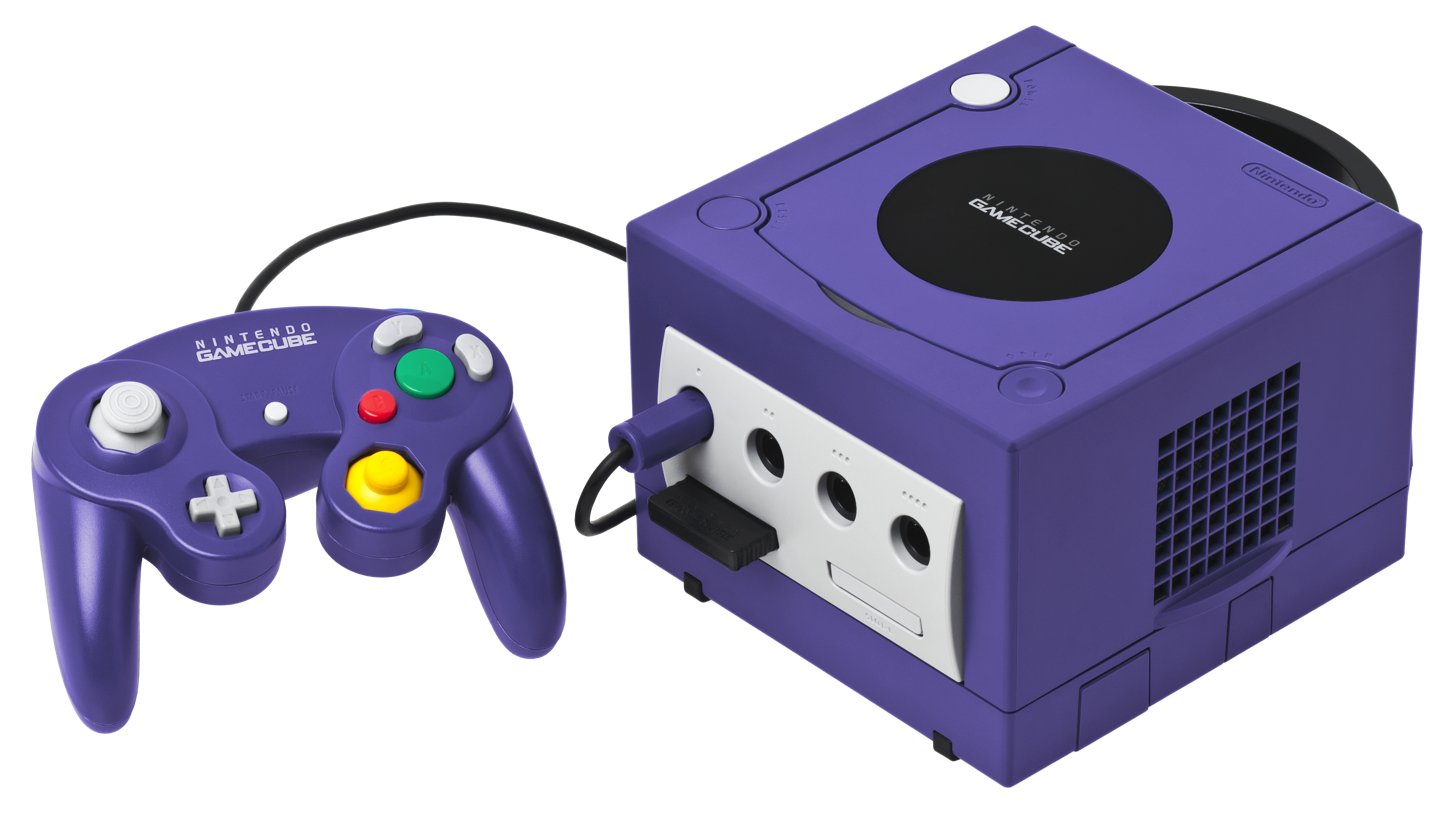
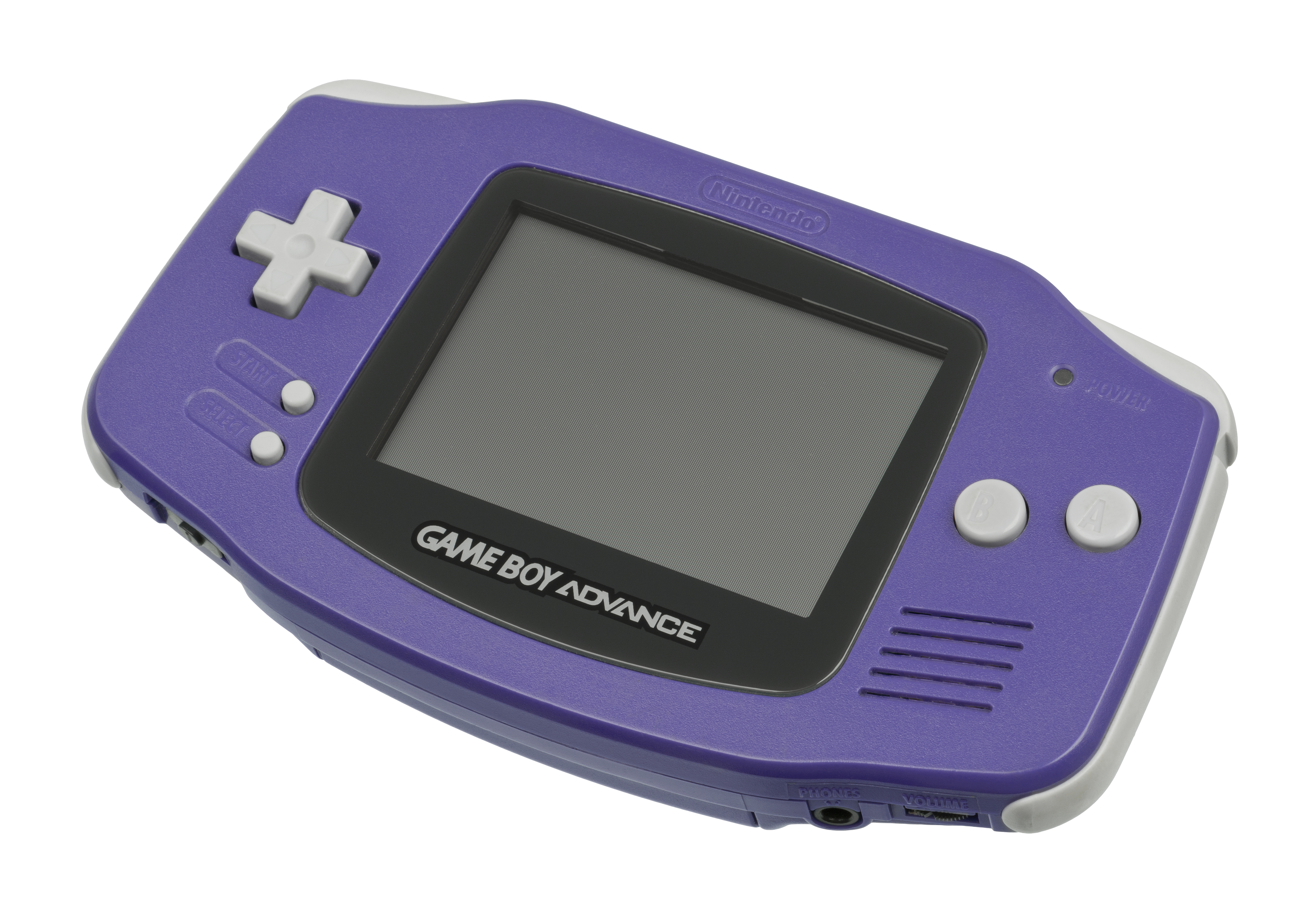
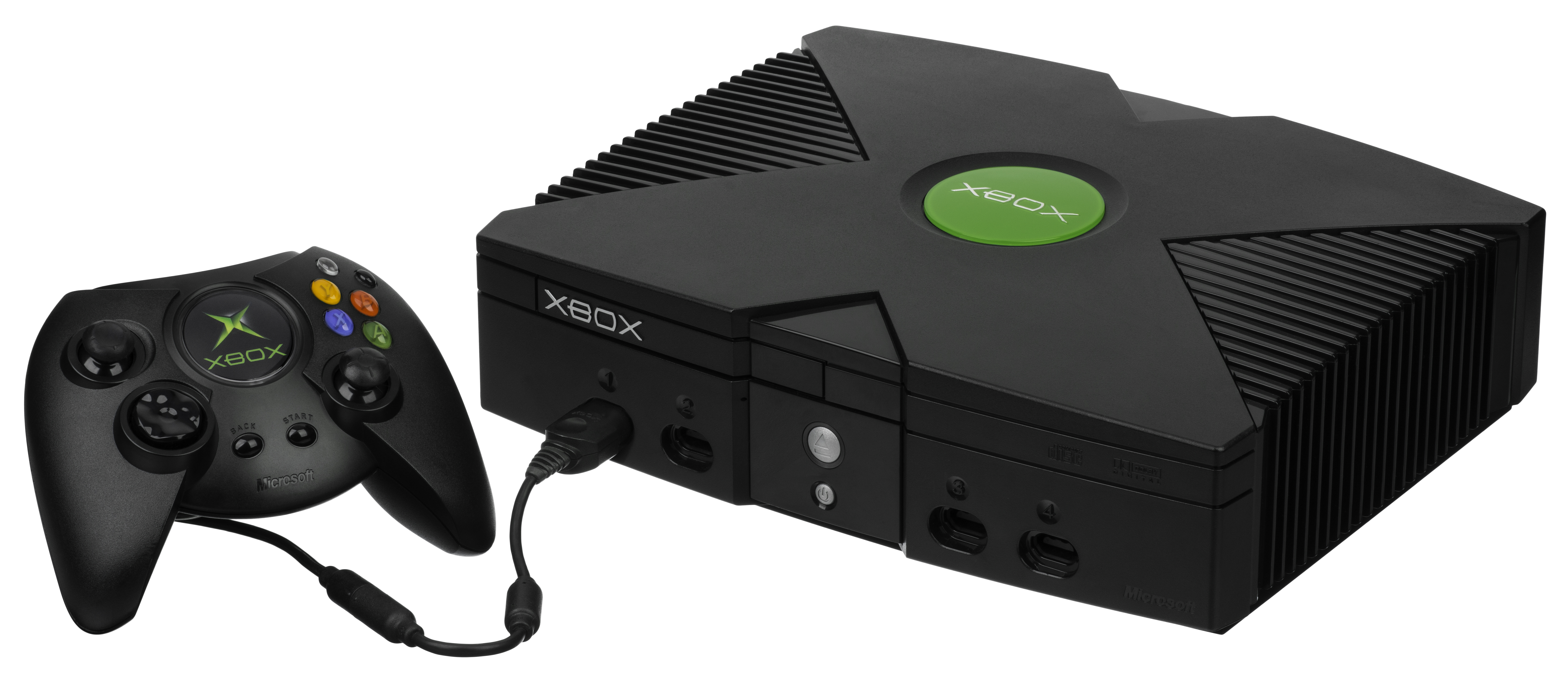
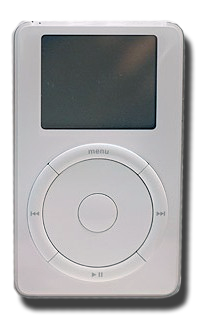
2001 saw the release of the GameCube and Game Boy Advance by Nintendo, the Xbox by Microsoft, and the iPod by Apple.

In music, 3.2 billion units were sold with a value of US$33.7 billion. DVD-Audio and Super Audio CD rose to prominence, with approximately 600 titles available in these formats. Portable music grew in popularity after Apple released the iTunes media library on January 9 and the first iPod music player device on October 23. The music sharing program Napster ended its services after it was accused of facilitating music piracy, but it was replaced by other programs such as FastTrack. Worldwide, the best-selling albums were Hybrid Theory (2000) by Linkin Park, No Angel (1999) by Dido, and Survivor (2001) by Destiny's Child. The best-selling non-English album was Cieli di Toscana (transl. Tuscan Skies; 2001) by Italian tenor Andrea Bocelli, which topped the charts in the Netherlands and Sweden and was the 23rd best-selling album globally.

Three major video game systems were released in 2001: the GameCube and the Game Boy Advance by Nintendo and the Xbox by Microsoft. Meanwhile, Sega ended its involvement in the market after the failure of the Dreamcast. The year 2001 is considered important in the video game industry, partly because of the release of many games recognized as classics. Many video games released in 2001 defined or redefined their respective genres, including hack and slash game Devil May Cry, first-person shooter game Halo: Combat Evolved, and open world action-adventure game Grand Theft Auto III, which is regarded as an industry-defining work.

=== Sports ===
Many sports events were postponed in the final months of 2001 after the September 11 attacks, particularly in the United States. Other sports were postponed in the United Kingdom and Ireland because of foot-and-mouth disease. Throughout the year, Salt Lake City, Utah, prepared for the 2002 Winter Olympics, while Beijing was announced as the host of the 2008 Summer Olympics.

Qualifications for the 2002 FIFA World Cup were the main football events in 2001. The world record for largest victory in an international football match was set by Australia in a 0–22 victory against Tonga on April 9. Australia set this record again with a 31–0 victory against American Samoa on April 11. The unbalanced nature of these matches prompted changes to the FIFA qualification process. In Europe, the UEFA Women's Cup began its first season, establishing a continent-wide women's competition for association football clubs under UEFA.

American tennis players Jennifer Capriati and Venus Williams shared the four Grand Slam tournaments, whilst France won the Davis Cup for the 9th time. NASCAR driver Dale Earnhardt, described as the greatest driver in the sport's history, died in a crash during the 2001 Daytona 500 on February 18. In April, golf player Tiger Woods became the only player to achieve a "Tiger Slam" after winning the 2001 Masters Tournament, in which he consecutively won all four championship golf titles outside of a single calendar year. The "Thunder in Africa" boxing match ended in a major upset after Hasim Rahman defeated champion Lennox Lewis on April 22. Lewis would go on to win a rematch on November 11. In cricket, Australia's record-setting streak of sixteen Test victories in a row was broken by India.

== Economy ==
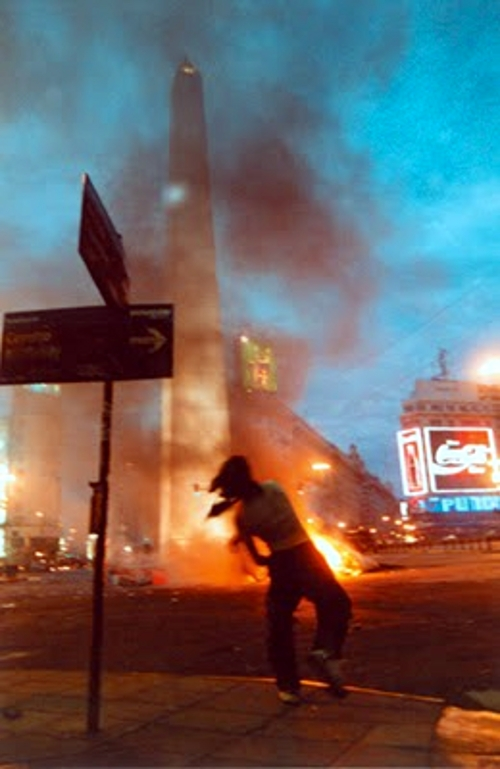
Social unrest occurred during the Argentine great depression.

A minor economic decline took place among many developed economies in 2001. It was amplified by the dot-com crash, in which dot-com companies went out of business every day for much of the year due to an overvaluation of the tech industry. Further economic disruption occurred in the aftermath of the September 11 attacks. These factors gave the first major demonstration of globalization causing mutual downturn across nations rather than the more typical mutual growth. Global growth in 2001 was the lowest in a decade, though middle income countries such as those in Eastern Europe were able to sustain growth despite the global downturn. Unemployment and deflation became concerns across developed nations. The year also marked a decline in international trade by about 1.5%, which contrasted with the 11% increase in 2000. This was the first negative change in international trade since 1982. IT industries and the dot-com crash are attributed for the decline in trade.

Economic crises took place in Argentina and in Turkey. The recession in Argentina negatively affected the economy throughout Latin America, and the years-long economic crisis reached its peak in December, causing widespread social unrest and the resignation of the President of Argentina. America Online (AOL), a U.S. online service provider, was at the apex of its popularity and purchased the media conglomerate Time Warner. The deal was announced on January 10, in the largest merger in history at that time. AOL would rapidly shrink thereafter, partly due to the decline of dial-up and rise of broadband, and the deal would fall apart before the end of the decade, which would be regarded as one of the world's greatest business failures.

Major businesses that ended operations in 2001 included the American energy company Enron and the national airlines of Belgium and Switzerland (Sabena and Swissair, respectively). The Enron scandal took place in October 2001 when, Enron was found to be committing fraud, bringing about the criminal conviction of several executives and causing the company to undergo the largest bankruptcy at that point in U.S. history. E-commerce declined in 2001, with the exception of eBay, which saw significant growth.

== Environment and weather ==
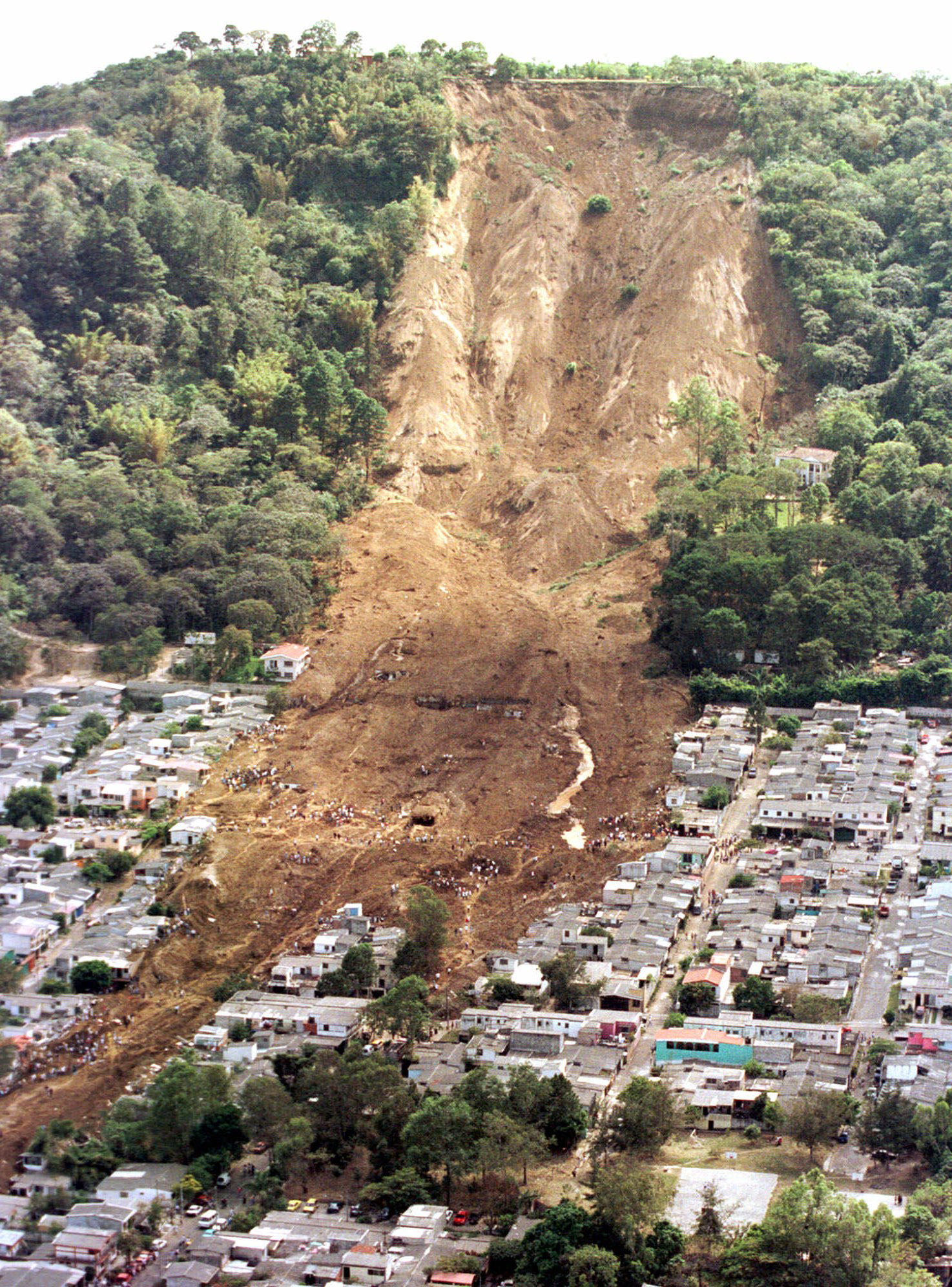
One of the landslides caused by the January 2001 earthquake in El Salvador

2001 was the second hottest year on record at the time, exceeded only by 1998. The Intergovernmental Panel on Climate Change released its Third Assessment Report on July 12. It warned that climate change in the 21st century could cause decreases in crop yields and an increase in temperature-related ailments and deaths. Droughts occurred in Australia, Central America, Kenya, and the Middle East, the latter continuing from years prior. Hungary, Russia and Southeast Asia experienced significant rains, causing flooding. North Asia underwent a severe winter. La Niña, which had been ongoing since 1998, ended in the east Atlantic by April 2001.

The Kyoto Protocol was weakened in March when President George W. Bush determined that the United States would relinquish its commitments to the agreement, but an effort to maintain the agreement in Europe was led by Germany. There was an environmental scare in Europe during an investigation into depleted uranium from the Kosovo War, but it was shown to pose no threat. The Stockholm Convention on Persistent Organic Pollutants, which restricted several organic pollutants, was signed on May 22 and 23.

There were four earthquakes in 2001 that caused significant casualties. El Salvador was struck by two of them: a 7.6-magnitude earthquake on January 13 and a 6.6-magnitude earthquake on February 13, which resulted in the deaths of at least 944 and 315 people respectively. The Bhuj earthquake, a 7.7-magnitude earthquake in Gujarat, India, on January 26 killed between 13,805 and 20,023 people, and destroyed nearly 340,000 buildings. An 8.4-magnitude earthquake, then the strongest that had occurred globally since 1965, killed at least 77 people in Peru on June 23. A 7.8-magnitude earthquake struck China with an epicenter near Kokoxili, close to the border between Qinghai and Xinjiang, on November 14, but it occurred in a sparsely populated mountainous region and there were no casualties. Sicily saw the eruption of Mount Etna, beginning on July 17 and continuing into the next month.

The 2001 Atlantic hurricane season was slightly more active than normal, including 15 tropical storms and hurricanes. The deadliest storms were Tropical Storm Allison in June, Hurricane Iris in October, and Hurricane Michelle in November. All three of these storms had their names retired by the World Meteorological Organization. Tropical Storm Allison was the deadliest tropical storm to hit the United States without reaching hurricane strength. The 2001 Pacific typhoon season was slightly larger than average, including 28 tropical storms, 20 typhoons, and 11 intense typhoons. The most powerful storms were Typhoon Podul in October and Typhoon Faxai in December.

== Health ==
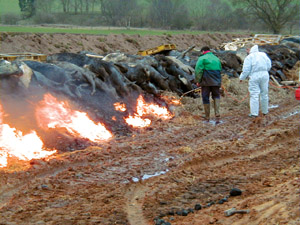
Cattle being burned to prevent spread of foot-and-mouth disease: millions of cattle died during the 2001 outbreak.

The World Health Organization (WHO) began a five-year program to reduce road injury fatalities following a warning of the problem's severity by the Red Cross the previous year. The WHO's Commission on Macroeconomics and Health released a report in 2001 detailing how spending by developed nations could protect health in developing nations. New drugs developed in 2001 include imatinib to treat cancer, and nateglinide to treat diabetes. 2001 saw the first self-contained artificial heart implanted in a patient.

Outbreaks of cholera occurred in Chad, India, Pakistan, Tanzania, South Africa, and throughout Western Africa; outbreaks of yellow fever took place in Brazil, Guinea, Ivory Coast, Liberia, and Peru; and outbreaks of meningococcal disease occurred in the African meningitis belt as well as Angola, the Democratic Republic of the Congo, and Ethiopia. Other major disease outbreaks included Crimean–Congo hemorrhagic fever in Kosovo and Pakistan, measles in India and South Korea, Legionnaires' disease in Spain and Norway, dengue fever in Venezuela, and plague in Zambia. Spain's outbreak of Legionnaires' disease was the largest ever recorded, with 449 confirmed cases and more than 800 suspected ones. An ebola outbreak continued from 2000 in Uganda until the final case was diagnosed on January 16. Another outbreak occurred in Gabon and the Republic of the Congo in October, which continued until July 2002. An outbreak of foot-and-mouth disease occurred among livestock in the United Kingdom in 2001, resulting in millions of farm animals being slaughtered to prevent spread.

Approximately 400,000 people in New York City were exposed to air pollution by carcinogens and other harmful particles such as asbestos and metals as a result of the September 11 attacks, and many would go on to suffer chronic illness as a result of exposure. A series of anthrax attacks against American government and media figures in October further spurred precautions against bioterrorism.

== Politics and law ==
Freedom House recognized 63% of national governments as electoral democracies by the end of 2001, with the Gambia and Mauritania being recognized as democracies following peaceful transfers of power. Peru also saw a significant expansion of civil rights after emerging from the authoritarian rule of Alberto Fujimori. Argentina, Liberia, Trinidad and Tobago, and Zimbabwe underwent significant democratic backsliding in 2001, with Liberia and Zimbabwe recognized as authoritarian governments by the end of the year. 64.65% of the world's population lived in countries that generally respected human rights, while 35.35% lived in countries that denied political rights and civil liberties.

Islamic terrorism became the predominant global political concern amidst the September 11 attacks and the war on terror. Islamic extremism was identified as a major threat to democracy and human rights, both in the Muslim world through the implementation of Islamism and in the rest of the world through terrorism. Racial discrimination, the ability to prosecute human rights violators, the number of refugees, and the problems of economic disadvantage were among the global human rights concerns that were given the most attention in 2001.

=== Domestic politics ===
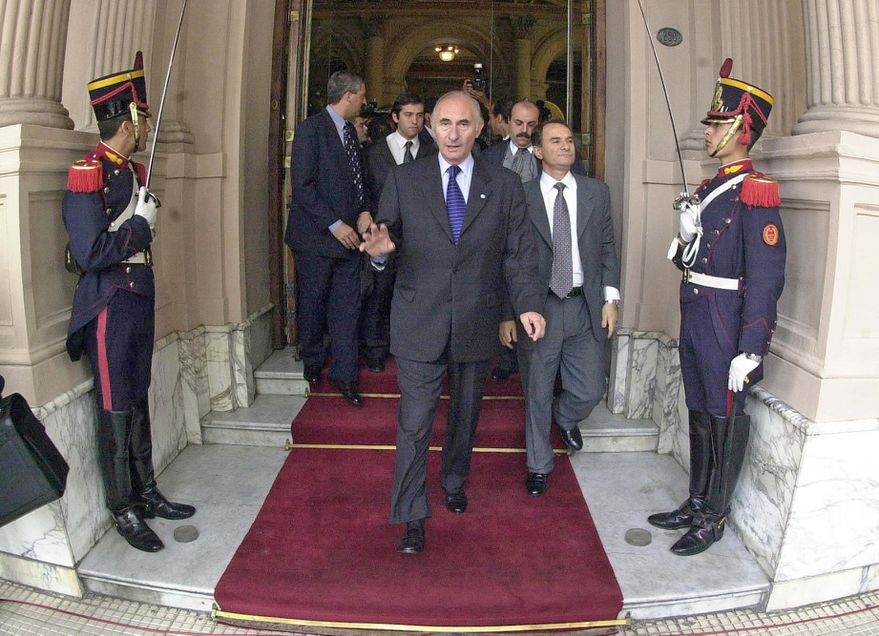
Former Argentine president Fernando de la Rúa leaving the Casa Rosada after resigning on December 21

The Islamic State of Afghanistan was the de jure government of Afghanistan in 2001, but for several years it had operated as a government in exile while the Taliban-led Islamic Emirate of Afghanistan held de facto control over most of the country. The Islamic State of Afghanistan was restored to power following the invasion of Afghanistan with the appointment of president Hamid Karzai on December 22.

Joseph Kabila became president of the Democratic Republic of the Congo following the assassination of his father, President Laurent-Désiré Kabila. President Abdurrahman Wahid of Indonesia was removed from office after thousands of protesters stormed the parliament building, and he was replaced by Vice President Megawati Sukarnoputri, daughter of former president Sukarno. The Second EDSA Revolution took place in the Philippines in January when President Joseph Estrada resigned amid an impeachment, and he was succeeded by Vice President Gloria Macapagal Arroyo. The Argentine great depression escalated with rioting in December, prompting President Fernando de la Rúa to resign on December 20 and the fall of the interim government soon after.

Kosovo and East Timor both held elections for the first time in 2001 as they sought independence. Other changes in leadership included the inauguration of George W. Bush as President of the United States, the election of Alejandro Toledo as President of Peru, the selection of Junichiro Koizumi as Prime Minister of Japan, and the election of Ariel Sharon as Prime Minister of Israel. Other leaders saw reconfirmation, including the reelection of Mohammad Khatami as President of Iran and the victory of the United Kingdom's Labour Party led by Tony Blair in the 2001 election.

In response to the September 11 attacks, the United States passed the controversial Patriot Act that granted the U.S. government significant surveillance powers. Ghana underwent its first peaceful transfer of power since 1979 when John Kufuor was sworn in as President of Ghana on January 7. The Netherlands became the first modern country to legalize same-sex marriage on April 1. The royal family of Nepal was killed on June 1 by Crown Prince Dipendra, who became king upon his father's death. Dipendra fell into a coma after shooting himself, and he died days later. He in turn was succeeded by his uncle Gyanendra. The Constitution of the Comoros was amended on December 24, creating a federal government with a rotating presidency and granting increased autonomy to the three island administrations.

=== International politics ===
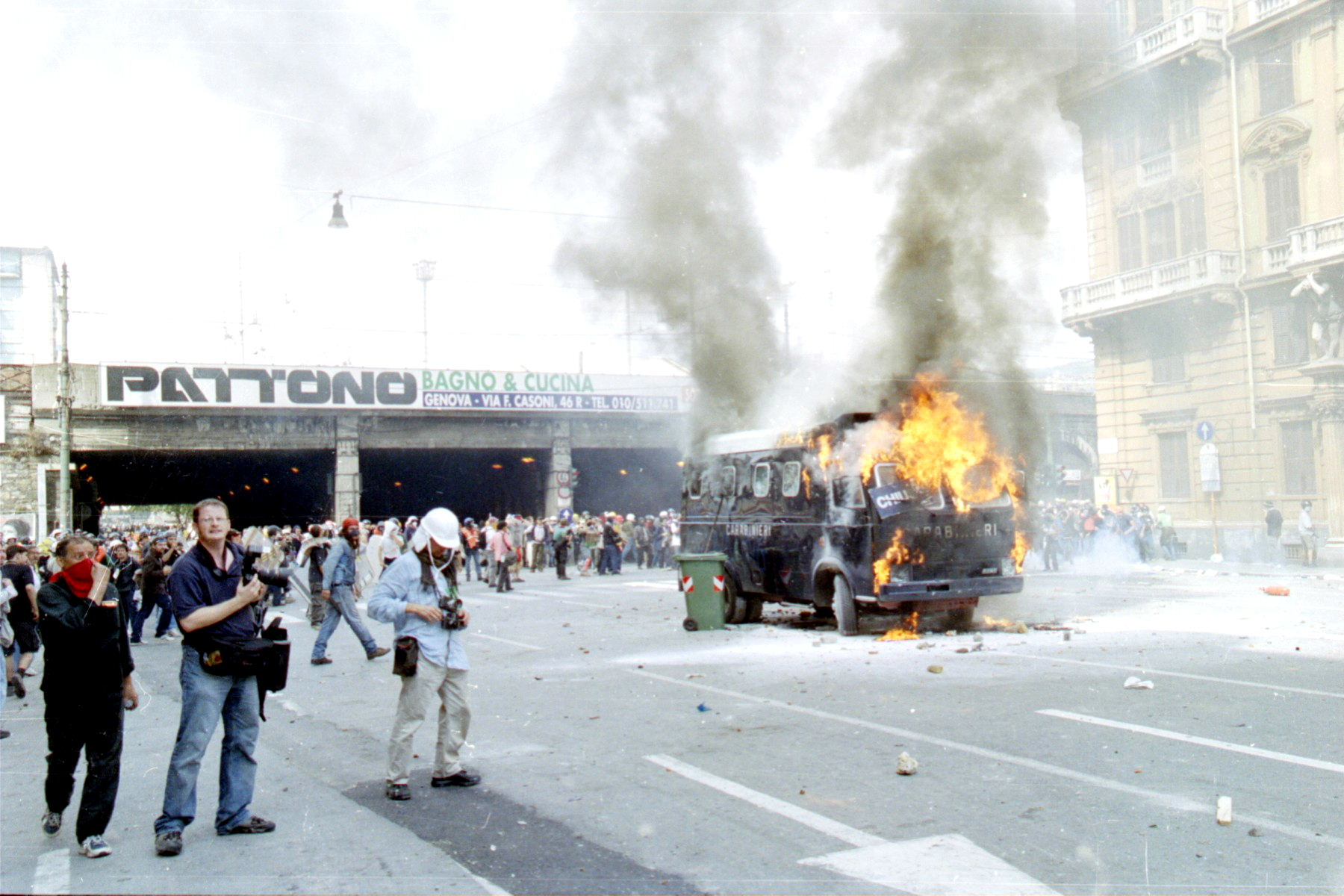
Anti-globalization activists burning a military vehicle outside of the 27th G8 summit

Two major regional organizations were announced in 2001. The African Union was established on May 26 as a pan-African forum to promote unity between African countries, including cooperation in economic and security issues, and would replace the Organisation of African Unity in 2002. The Shanghai Cooperation Organisation was announced on June 15 to facilitate political and economic cooperation between Asian countries. Three countries joined the World Trade Organization (WTO) in 2001: Lithuania on May 31, Moldova on July 26, and China on December 11. The WTO began the Doha Development Round in November to negotiate lower trade barriers between countries and integrate developing nations into the global economy.

The World Conference against Racism 2001 began on August 31, in Durban, South Africa, under the auspices of the United Nations. Israel and the United States withdrew from the conference on September 3 over objections to a draft resolution document equating Zionism with racism and singling out the Jewish state for war crimes. The Aarhus Convention took effect on October 30, establishing the right to environmental information and environmental justice for European and Central Asian countries. The 27th G8 summit was marred by anti-globalization protests in Genoa, Italy. Massive demonstrations, drawing an estimated 200,000 people, were held against the meeting. One demonstrator, Carlo Giuliani, was killed by a policeman, and several others were injured. The September 11 attacks demonstrated a need for international law to address terrorism and other non-state actors, and a push by UN Secretary General Kofi Annan in November saw progress in multiple international treaties. The Budapest Convention on Cybercrime, the first international treaty to address cybercrime, was signed on November 23.

Diplomatic disputes in 2001 included a diplomatic incident when an American spy plane and a Chinese fighter plane collided over the South China Sea, and a dispute between Japan and North Korea when the North Korean leader's son, Kim Jong-nam, attempted to sneak into Tokyo Disneyland. Achievement tests and stricter penalties against delinquent students became controversial educational practices in several countries.

=== Law ===
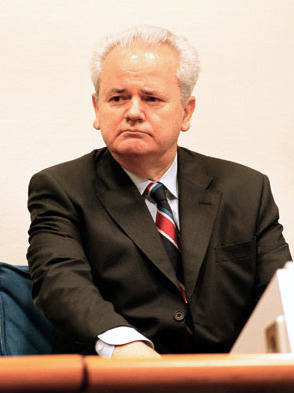
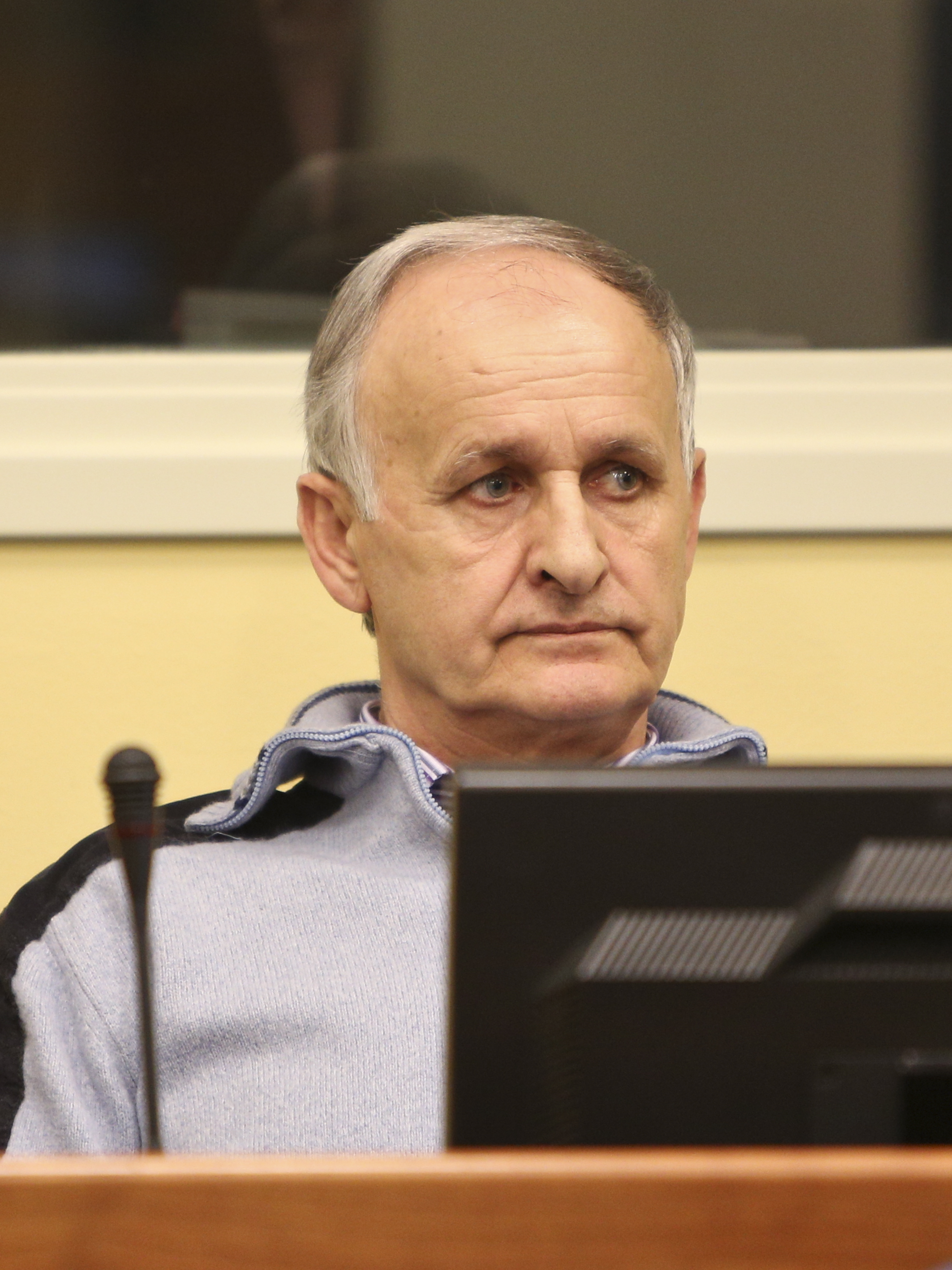
Former Yugoslav President Slobodan Milošević and general Radislav Krstić both faced prosecution in 2001 by the International Criminal Tribunal for the former Yugoslavia.

Belgium set precedent when the government prosecuted crimes of the Rwandan genocide, invoking a 1993 law that gave Belgian courts jurisdiction over Geneva Conventions violations that take place anywhere in the world. In another first for international law, the International Criminal Tribunal for the former Yugoslavia determined that wartime sexual violence was a war crime. President Slobodan Milošević of Yugoslavia (1997–2000) was arrested on April 1 for his role in the Srebrenica massacre and other crimes against humanity committed during the Bosnian War. He was the first head of state to see trial for war crimes in this manner. The tribunal also prosecuted general Radislav Krstić, bringing its first conviction for genocide.

The International Court of Justice heard two new cases in 2001: Liechtenstein challenged Germany's claim that Lichtenstein property had been seized from Germany during World War II, and Nicaragua brought a challenge against Colombia regarding maritime borders. It delivered judgement in a 1991 case of a territorial dispute between Bahrain and Qatar, and it ruled in a German challenge against the United States that the court's own provisional orders are binding.

== Religion ==
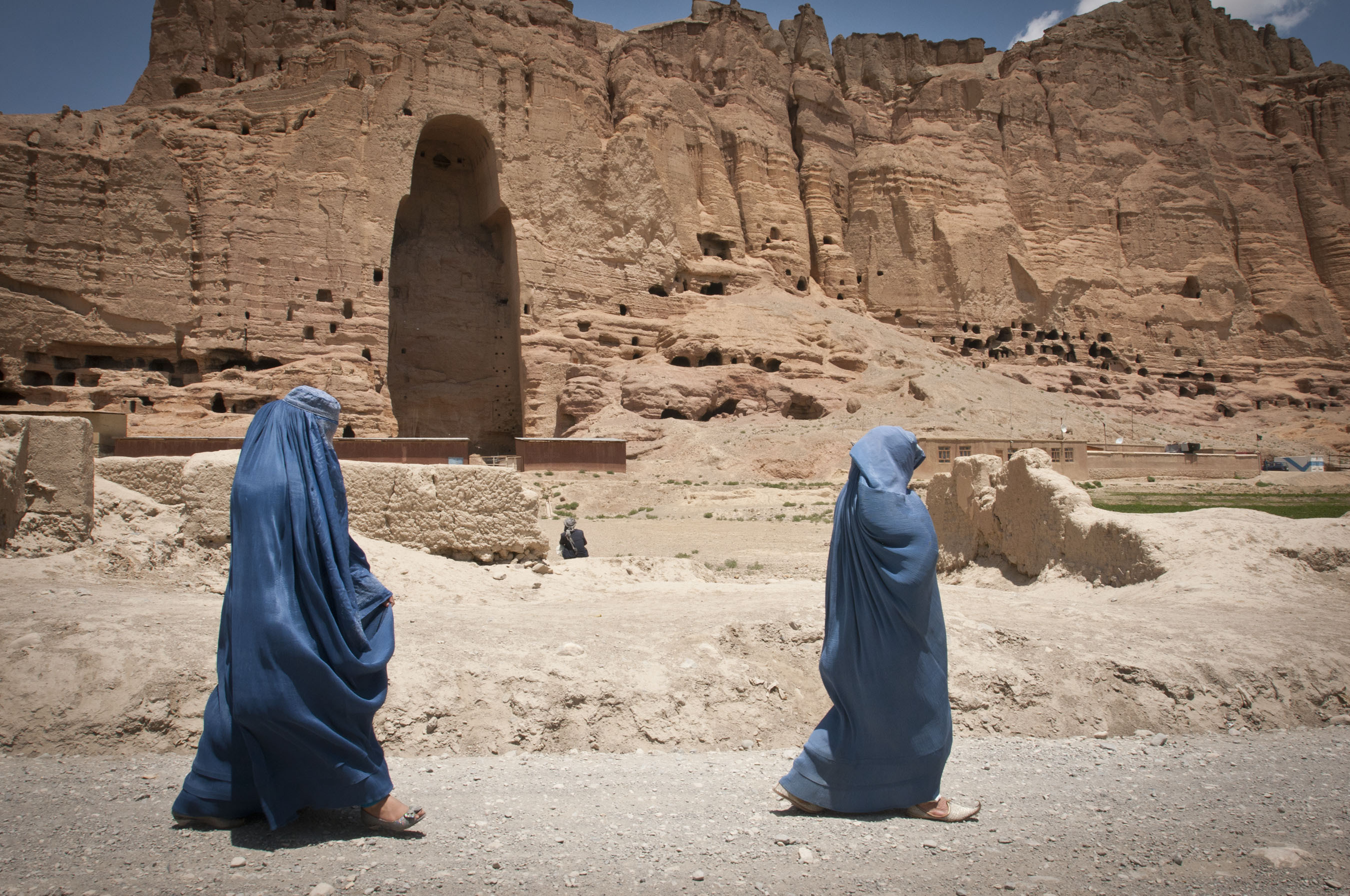
Two women walk past the cavity where the Buddhas of Bamiyan used to stand before being destroyed by the Taliban.

The religiously motivated September 11 attacks came to dominate global discourse about religion in 2001. Following the attacks, both religious tolerance and religious intolerance came to the fore, with an increase in Islamophobia, particularly in the United States and Europe. The imposition of religious law became a major subject of debate, particularly in Afghanistan, where the perpetrators of the attacks were protected by the fundamentalist Taliban, as well as Nigeria, where conflict between Christians and Muslims escalated amid the implementation of Islamic law. Prior to the attacks, the Taliban had incited a different religious controversy by destroying the Buddhas of Bamiyan despite the international community's pleas. Another religious conflict took place in Khartoum, Sudan, when Christians were forcibly expelled from the Anglican cathedral during Easter services.

Pope John Paul II made trips throughout 2001 to preach for good relations with other religions: he became the first pope to visit a mosque in Syria to build relations with Muslims, and he visited Greece to build relations with Orthodox Christians. Relations between Catholicism and Judaism were strained following a dispute over the release of Holocaust records held by the Vatican. The Pope named 37 cardinals on January 21, bringing the total number to 128. The Catholic Church also began investigations of sexual abuse cases among its priests in 2001, with 3,000 cases being considered over the following decade. The subject of women's ordination was also a subject of debate within the Catholic Church.

The duodecennial Hindu pilgrimage and festival Kumbh Mela was held for 42 days in January and February 2001. A 50-square-mile (130 km^{2}) tent city was created within Allahabad to support the festival. The Sultan Qaboos Grand Mosque in Oman was completed in May. At the time, its chandelier was the largest in the world. Jediism became a social phenomenon in 2001 after a movement to self-report as Jedi caused it to become the fourth largest religion in the United Kingdom and the second largest religion in New Zealand.

== Science ==
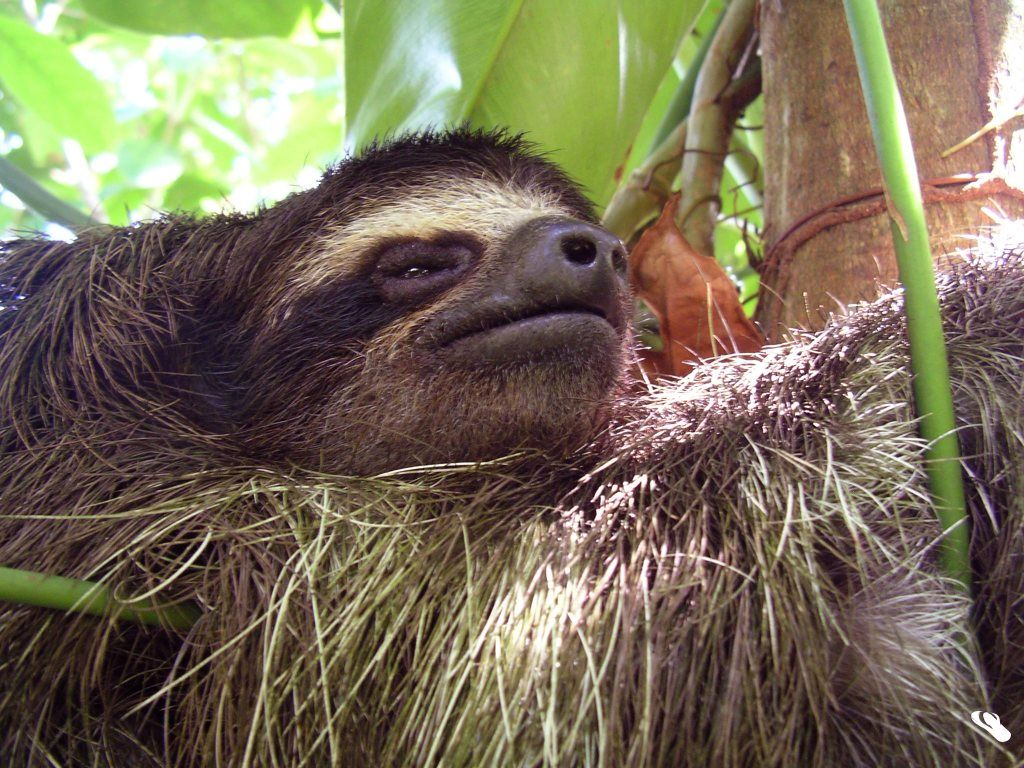
The pygmy three-toed sloth was first described in 2001.

Several anthropological and archaeological developments were made in 2001, including the extraction of mtDNA from prehistoric skeletons and the discovery of an arrowhead lodged in the shoulder of Ötzi, a 5,300-year-old mummy, after a CT scan was performed on him. Newly described hominids included Sahelanthropus and Ardipithecus, while two additional hominids, Kenyanthropus and Orrorin, were proposed. January saw the extraction of DNA from a 60,000-year-old skeleton, the oldest human DNA to be studied to that point. In October, the discovery of a prehistoric Sarcosuchus skeleton was announced after digging began the previous year. Archaeological discoveries include rock art in Andros, 40,000-year-old tools in Mamontovaya Kurya, terracotta citizens in a pit adjacent to the Terracotta Army, a walled city at Dholavira, and a 2,900-year-old sweat lodge in Cuello.

Two different groups, the Human Genome Project and Celera Genomics, published the first maps of the human genome on February 15 and 16, respectively. Human cloning was a controversial subject in 2001, and opponents called for bans on human cloning internationally. Other developments in genetics included a completed sequencing of the oryza sativa genome and an experiment saw the successful creation of tomatoes genetically modified to survive in saltwater. The pygmy three-toed sloth was among the animals first described in 2001. Birds discovered include the Mishana tyrannulet, the Chapada flycatcher, the Vanuatu petrel, and the chestnut-eared laughingthrush. The Ruizia parviflora tree was rediscovered on Mauritius when it was thought extinct since 1863. Conversely, the 1993 discovery of pseudonovibos spiralis was determined in February 2001 to be unfounded.

The discovery of the Lost City Hydrothermal Field on the Atlantis Massif was formally announced in 2001. The phenomenon of neutrino oscillation was confirmed in 2001, while the 1999 discovery of element 118 was retracted. The University of the Arctic was founded in 2001 as a joint project between several northern countries.

=== Technology and transportation ===
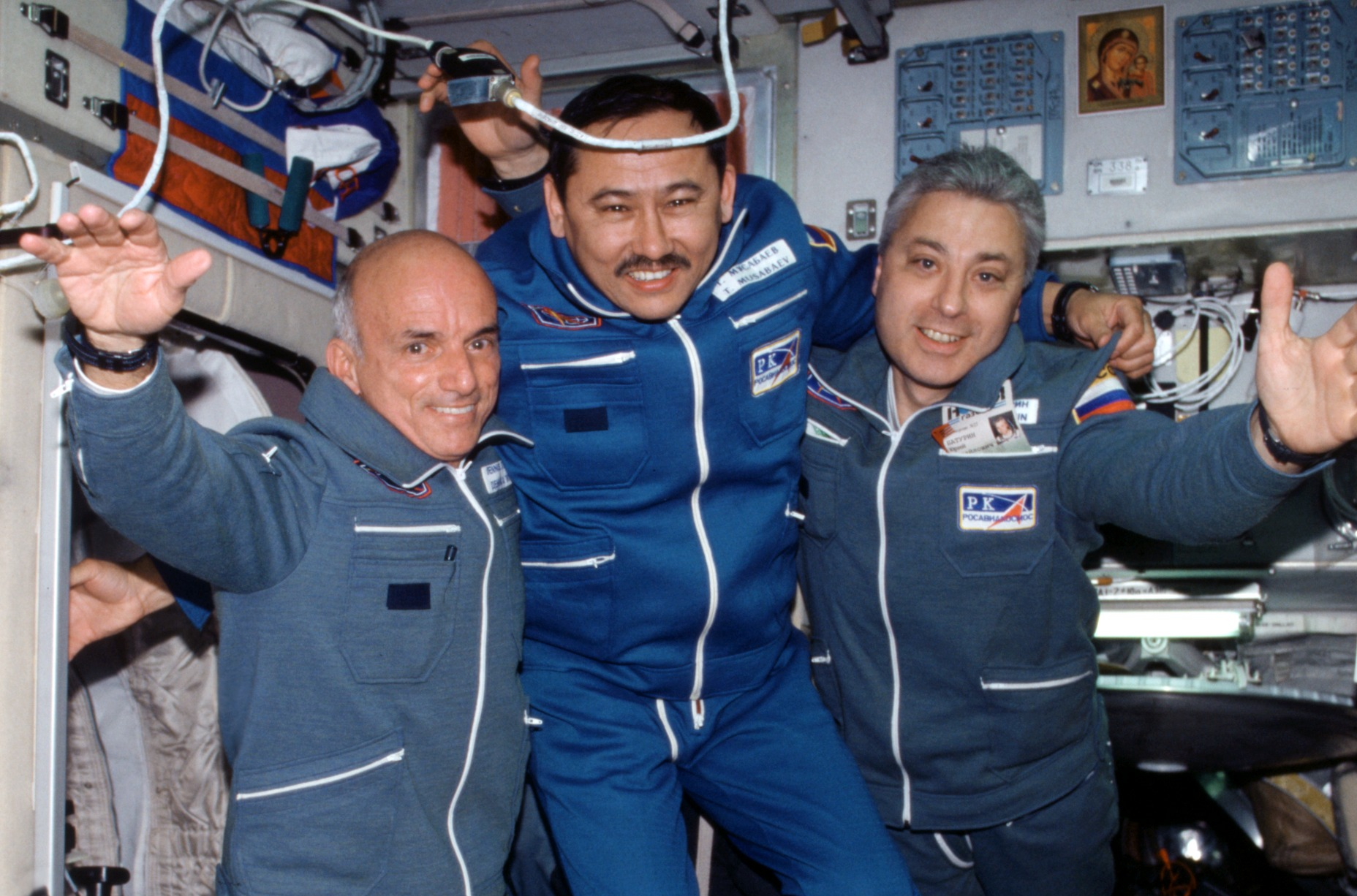
Crew of Soyuz TM-32: (L–R) Dennis Tito, Talgat Musabayev, and Yuri Baturin

The computer industry saw major decline during the recession in 2001. Apple Computer Inc. released the Mac OS X operating system for Mac computers on March 24, and it discontinued the Power Mac G4 Cube. 3G wireless technology first became available on October 1 when it was adopted by Japanese telecommunications company NTT Docomo with its Freedom of Mobile Multimedia Access service. Microsoft released the Windows XP operating system to retail on October 25. The most powerful supercomputer as of 2001 was designed by IBM for the Lawrence Livermore National Laboratory in the United States. Several malware scares took place in 2001, including the Code Red, Nimda, and Sircam worms.

There were only 57 successful orbital spaceflights in 2001, the fewest since 1963. Eight of these launches were crewed missions. Two failed spaceflights also took place. The NEAR Shoemaker made the first successful landing of a spacecraft on an asteroid on February 12, and the Destiny module was connected to the International Space Station the same month. The Russian Mir space station was deorbited and destroyed on March 23, landing in the Pacific Ocean. The 2001 Mars Odyssey orbiter was launched on April 7 and arrived at Mars on October 24. American entrepreneur Dennis Tito became the first space tourist on April 28 aboard the Russian Soyuz TM-32. 28978 Ixion was discovered on May 22. The Genesis probe was launched on August 8 to collect solar wind samples. Deep Space 1 carried out a flyby of Comet Borrelly on September 22, and Galileo carried out a flyby of Io on October 15. An atmosphere was discovered on an exoplanet for the first time on November 27.

Air travel in the United States and worldwide was heavily affected by the September 11 attacks. Commercial flights in the United States were grounded for three days, and air travel then became subject to significantly increased security measures. Incheon International Airport opened in Incheon on March 22, and the TGV Mediterranee railway opened in France. The K-141 Kursk nuclear submarine was lifted from the Barents Sea after the Kursk submarine disaster of the previous year. The Segway, a self-balancing personal transporter invented by Dean Kamen, was unveiled on December 3 after months of public speculation and media hype, on the ABC News morning program Good Morning America. The reveal that it was a self-balancing transporter was seen as a disappointment.

== Events ==
=== January ===
- January 1 – Greece becomes the 12th country to join the Eurozone.
- January 7 – Ghana undergoes its first peaceful transfer of power since 1979 when John Kufuor is sworn in as President of Ghana.
- January 9 – Apple Inc. launches iTunes, a software program that acts as a media player and media library.
- January 13 – A 7.6-magnitude earthquake hits El Salvador, killing at least 944 people and causing massive landslides, which leaves thousands of those affected homeless.
- January 15
  - Creative Commons is founded.
  - Wikipedia, which became the world's largest encyclopedia, is launched.
- January 16
  - Assassination of Laurent-Désiré Kabila: The President of the Democratic Republic of the Congo is shot in his office during the Second Congo War and rushed to Harare in Zimbabwe for medical treatment; his death will be announced two days later. He is succeeded by his son, Joseph Kabila.
  - The final documented case of the 2000–2001 Uganda ebola outbreak is diagnosed.
- January 20
  - Impeachment proceedings against Philippine President Joseph Estrada end prematurely as he is peacefully overthrown in the Second EDSA Revolution. Vice President Gloria Macapagal Arroyo succeeds him as president.
- January 21
  - Taba Summit: Talks between Israel and the Palestinian National Authority begin in Egypt.
  - Pope John Paul II names 37 cardinals in one day for a total of 128.
- January 22 – The 2001 insurgency in Macedonia begins when a police station is shelled by the National Liberation Army in Tearce, near the border with Kosovo.
- January 23 – A self-immolation incident takes place in Tiananmen Square in central Beijing, China. Five members of the Falun Gong are alleged to have set themselves on fire, but details surrounding the incident are disputed by Falun Gong sources.
- January 25 – Armenia and Azerbaijan join the Council of Europe.
- January 26 – A 7.7 M_{w} Gujarat earthquake shakes Western India with a maximum Mercalli intensity of X (Extreme), leaving thousands of people dead and more than 166,000 others injured.
- January 29 – Corruption scandals surrounding Indonesian President Abdurrahman Wahid prompt thousands of protesters to storm the Indonesian parliament building.
- January 31 – 2001 Japan Airlines mid-air incident: Japan Airlines Flight 907 and Flight 958 almost collided with each other in Yaizu, Shizuoka, Japan. Flight 907 safely landed at Narita Airport and Flight 958 continued to Naha Airport. 100 people were injured.

=== February ===
- February 6 – 2001 Israeli prime ministerial election: Ariel Sharon of the Likud party is elected Prime Minister of Israel.

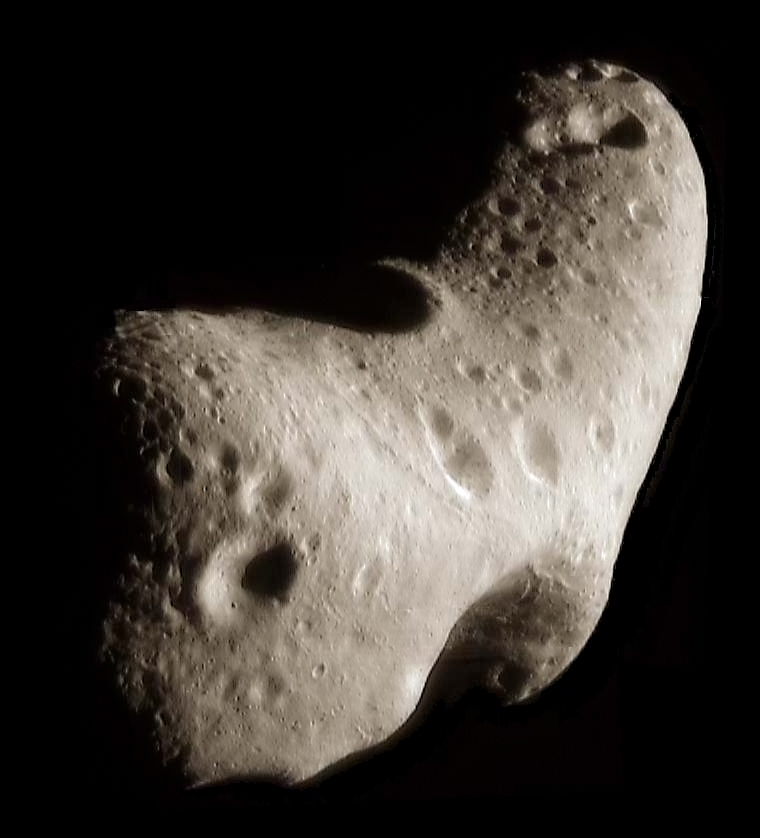
433 Eros as seen from the NEAR spacecraft

- February 11 – 2001 Liechtenstein general election: The Progressive Citizens' Party led by Otmar Hasler wins a majority of 13 seats in the Landtag.
- February 12
  - The NEAR Shoemaker spacecraft touches down in the "saddle" region of 433 Eros, a near-Earth object, becoming the first spacecraft to land on an asteroid.
  - The Human Genome Project publishes the first draft of its human genome sequence.
- February 13 – A 6.6-magnitude earthquake hits El Salvador, killing at least 315 people.
- February 16 – Iraq disarmament crisis: British and U.S. forces carry out bombing raids to disable Iraq's air defense network.
- February 18 – Robert Hanssen, an FBI Agent who had been spying for the Russians (after he had spied for the Soviets), is arrested.
- February 19 – The 2001 United Kingdom foot-and-mouth outbreak begins.
- February 22 – The International Criminal Tribunal for the former Yugoslavia (ICTY) sentences three Bosnian Serb soldiers to prison for wartime sexual violence, recognizing it as a war crime for the first time.
- February 25 – Sampit conflict: Mass ethnic violence begins in Sampit, Indonesia, killing hundreds of people.

=== March ===
- March 2 – Despite pleas from the international community to spare them, the Taliban government of Afghanistan begins destroying the Buddhas of Bamiyan, having declared that they are idols.
- March 4 – The Hintze Ribeiro Bridge collapses in northern Portugal, killing 59 people.
- March 14 – Battle of Tetovo: Violence erupts between Albanian rebels and Macedonian soldiers in Tetovo. Conflict in Tetovo will continue for months during the 2001 insurgency in Macedonia.
- March 16 – Shijiazhuang bombings: 108 people are killed in a series of bombings in Shijiazhuang, China.
- March 22
  - Kenyanthropus is described as an early hominid after the discovery of remains in Kenya.
  - Incheon International Airport opens in Incheon, South Korea.
- March 23 – The deorbit of Russian space station Mir is processed, with debris falling into the South Pacific Ocean after the station enters the atmosphere and is destroyed.
- March 24 – Apple Inc. released the Mac OS X operating system for Mac computers.
- March 26 – World Championship Wrestling goes out of business and is purchased by its chief competitor, the World Wrestling Federation, bringing an end to the Monday Night Wars.
- March 28 – The United States declares its intention to end involvement in the Kyoto Protocol.

=== April ===
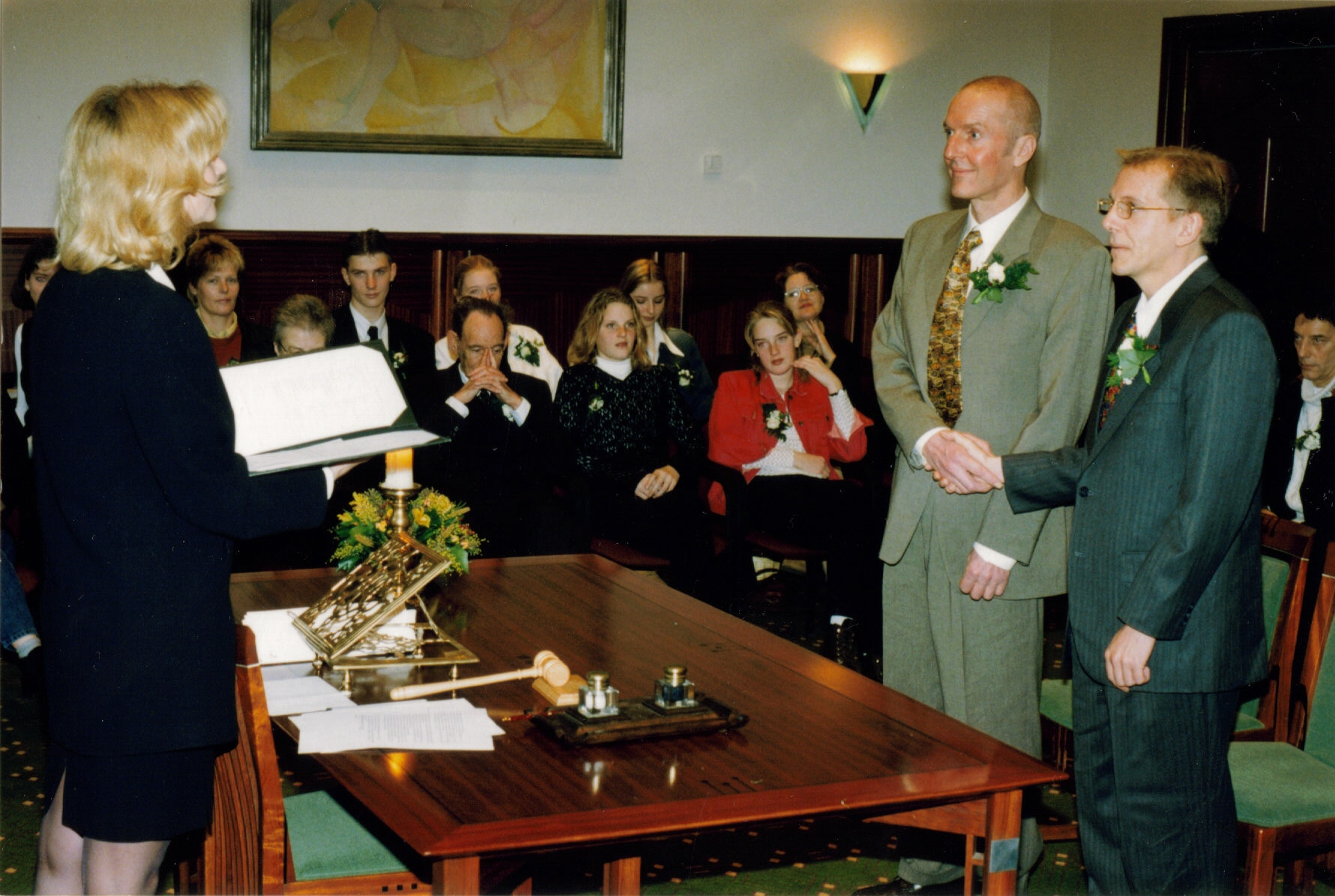
Two men marrying in Amsterdam on April 1, the first day in which the possibility to marry was opened to same-sex couples

- April 1
  - The Act on the Opening up of Marriage goes into effect in the Netherlands, which becomes the first modern country to legalize same-sex marriage.
  - Hainan Island incident: A Chinese fighter jet collides with a U.S. EP-3E surveillance aircraft, which is forced to make an emergency landing in Hainan, China. The U.S. crew is detained for 10 days and the F-8 Chinese pilot, Wang Wei, goes missing and is presumed dead.
  - Former Yugoslav President Slobodan Milošević surrenders to police special forces to be tried on charges of crimes against humanity.
- April 7 – The NASA orbiter 2001 Mars Odyssey launches on a Delta II rocket.
- April 11 – Australia's football team wins against American Samoa in a record 31–0 victory, just two days after setting the record with a 0–22 victory against Tonga.
- April 15 – Extreme Championship Wrestling files for bankruptcy and ceases operations, is eventually bought by its competitor, the World Wrestling Federation.
- April 17
  - Nông Đức Mạnh is chosen as General Secretary of the Communist Party of Vietnam.
  - Israel occupies an area in the Gaza Strip, killing two people. Israeli forces withdraw the same day after the United States denounces the attack.
- April 18 – 2001 Burundian coup d'état attempt: A group of junior officers make a failed attempt to overthrow President Pierre Buyoya of Burundi.
- April 22 – Hasim Rahman wins an upset victory against champion Lennox Lewis in the "Thunder in Africa" boxing match.
- April 25 – A ceasefire is broken during the Eelam War III in Sri Lanka.
- April 26
  - Junichiro Koizumi becomes the 86th Prime Minister of Japan.
  - The Parliament of Ukraine votes to dismiss Prime Minister Viktor Yushchenko.
- April 28
  - The Russian spacecraft Soyuz TM-32 lifts off from the Baikonur Cosmodrome in Kazakhstan, carrying the first space tourist, American entrepreneur Dennis Tito, and two Russian cosmonauts.
  - Vejce ambush: Eight Macedonian soldiers are killed in an ambush by the NLA near Vejce, a village in the Šar Mountains, Macedonia. It represents the heaviest death toll for the government forces in a single incident during the insurgency.

=== May ===
- May 7 – In Banja Luka, Bosnia and Herzegovina, an attempt is made to reconstruct the historic 16th-century Ferhadija Mosque. Serbian nationalists respond with riots and mass violence against Bosnian Muslims.
- May 13 – The House of Freedoms coalition led by Silvio Berlusconi wins the Italian general election.
- May 18 – 2001 HaSharon Mall suicide bombing: A Hamas suicide bomber kills six people in Netanya, Israel. The Israeli government responds with the first use of airstrikes against Palestine since 1967.
- May 21 – The Končulj Agreement results in the disarmament of the Liberation Army of Preševo, Medveđa and Bujanovac, ending the Insurgency in the Preševo Valley.
- May 22
  - 28978 Ixion, a large trans-Neptunian object and a possible dwarf planet, is discovered during the Deep Ecliptic Survey.
  - The Stockholm Convention on Persistent Organic Pollutants is adopted by 127 countries to limit pollution internationally.
- May 24 – Sherpa Temba Tsheri, 15, becomes the youngest person to reach the summit of Mount Everest.
- May 26 – The African Union is formed to replace the Organisation of African Unity. It will begin operation the following year.
- May 28 – 2001 Central African Republic coup d'état attempt: Central African forces led by André Kolingba carry out a failed attempt to overthrow the government of the Central African Republic. Dozens are killed in the ensuing violence.
- May 31
  - Lithuania joins the World Trade Organization.
  - Research into Crohn's disease confirms that it is identified with mutation of the NOD2 gene.

=== June ===
- June 1
  - Crown Prince Dipendra of Nepal kills his father, the king, his mother and other members of the royal family with an assault rifle and then shoots himself in the Nepalese royal massacre. Dipendra is recognized as King of Nepal while in a coma.
  - Dolphinarium discotheque bombing: A Hamas suicide bomber kills 21 people, mostly teenagers, in the Dolphinarium disco in Tel Aviv, Israel.
- June 4 – Gyanendra ascends the throne of Nepal on the death of his nephew, Dipendra.

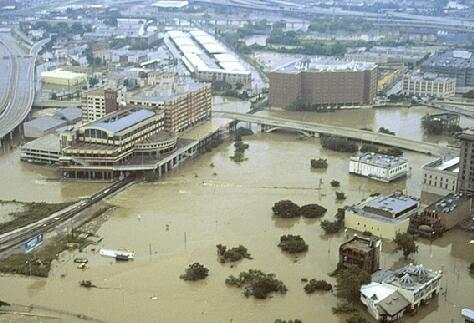
Buffalo Bayou and White Oak Bayou at Main Street after Tropical Storm Allison hit Houston, Texas, U.S.

- June 5 – Tropical Storm Allison hits the U.S. state of Texas, severely flooding Houston and killing 23 people.
- June 7
  - 2001 United Kingdom general election: Tony Blair and the Labour Party win a second landslide victory.
  - Former Argentinian president Carlos Menem is arrested on suspicion of illegal arms sales.
- June 12 – Aračinovo crisis: Albanian rebels violate a 24-hour cease fire with Macedonian soldiers.
- June 15 – Declaration to establish the Shanghai Cooperation Organisation is signed.
- June 19
  - Syria withdraws thousands of forces from a decades-long military presence in Beirut, Lebanon.
  - Germany enacts a program to compensate Holocaust survivors that were subject to slave labor.
  - Royal Ulster Constabulary officers intervene to protect Catholic schoolchildren and their parents from Ulster loyalist stone throwers while entering their school in Ardoyne, marking the beginning of the Holy Cross dispute.
- June 21 – The world's longest train is run by BHP Iron Ore between Newman and Port Hedland in Western Australia (a distance of 275 km or 171 mi); the train consists of 682 loaded iron ore wagons and 8 GE AC6000CW locomotives, giving a gross weight of almost 100,000 tonnes and moves 82,262 tonnes of ore; the train is 7.353 km (4.569 mi) long.
- June 23 – An 8.4 M_{w} southern Peru earthquake shakes coastal Peru with a maximum Mercalli intensity of VIII (Severe). A destructive tsunami follows, leaving at least 77 people dead, and 2,687 others injured.
- June 25 – Alkhan-Kala operation: Russian forces carry out a zachistka operation in Alkhan-Kala, Grozny, Chechnya, during the Second Chechen War. Chechen warlord Arbi Barayev is killed.

=== July ===
- July – The largest ever recorded outbreak of Legionnaires' disease occurs in Murcia, Spain. 449 cases are confirmed, with more than 800 suspected ones.
- July 2 – The world's first self-contained artificial heart is implanted in Robert Tools in the United States.
- July 4 – Vladivostok Air Flight 352 crashes on approach while landing at Irkutsk Airport, Russia, killing all 145 people aboard.
- July 7 – 2001 Bradford riots: Ethnic violence is provoked in Bradford, England, by the far-right National Front and far-left Anti-Nazi League.
- July 12 – The Intergovernmental Panel on Climate Change releases its Third Assessment Report.
- July 13 – The International Olympic Committee chooses Beijing to host the 2008 Summer Olympics.
- July 14 – Agra Summit: India and Pakistan begin talks to improve relations. The summit ends inconclusively on July 16.
- July 16 – China and Russia sign the 2001 Sino-Russian Treaty of Friendship.

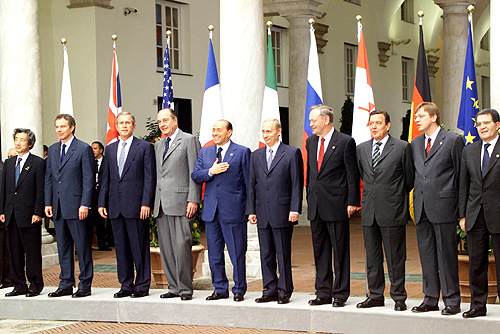
Photo session of the G8 leaders in Genoa, 2001: (L–R) Junichiro Koizumi, Tony Blair, George W. Bush, Jacques Chirac, Silvio Berlusconi, Vladimir Putin, Jean Chretien, Gerhard Schroeder, Guy Verhofstadt, and Romano Prodi

- July 20–22 – The 27th G8 summit takes place in Genoa, Italy. Massive demonstrations, drawing an estimated 200,000 people, are held against the meeting by members of the anti-globalization movement. One demonstrator, Carlo Giuliani, is killed by a policeman, and several others are injured.
- July 23 – Megawati Sukarnoputri is inaugurated as the first female president of Indonesia.
- July 24
  - Bandaranaike Airport attack: The Tamil Tigers bomb the Bandaranaike International Airport in Sri Lanka during the Sri Lankan Civil War.
  - Simeon Saxe-Coburg-Gotha, deposed as the last Tsar of Bulgaria when a child, is sworn in as the democratically elected 48th Prime Minister of Bulgaria.
- July 26 – Moldova joins the World Trade Organization.
- July 28 – Alejandro Toledo becomes the President of Peru.

=== August ===
- August – A ceasefire is negotiated to end the War of the Peters.
- August 2 – The ICTY convicts Bosnian Serb general Radislav Krstić on the charge of genocide for his role in the Srebrenica massacre.

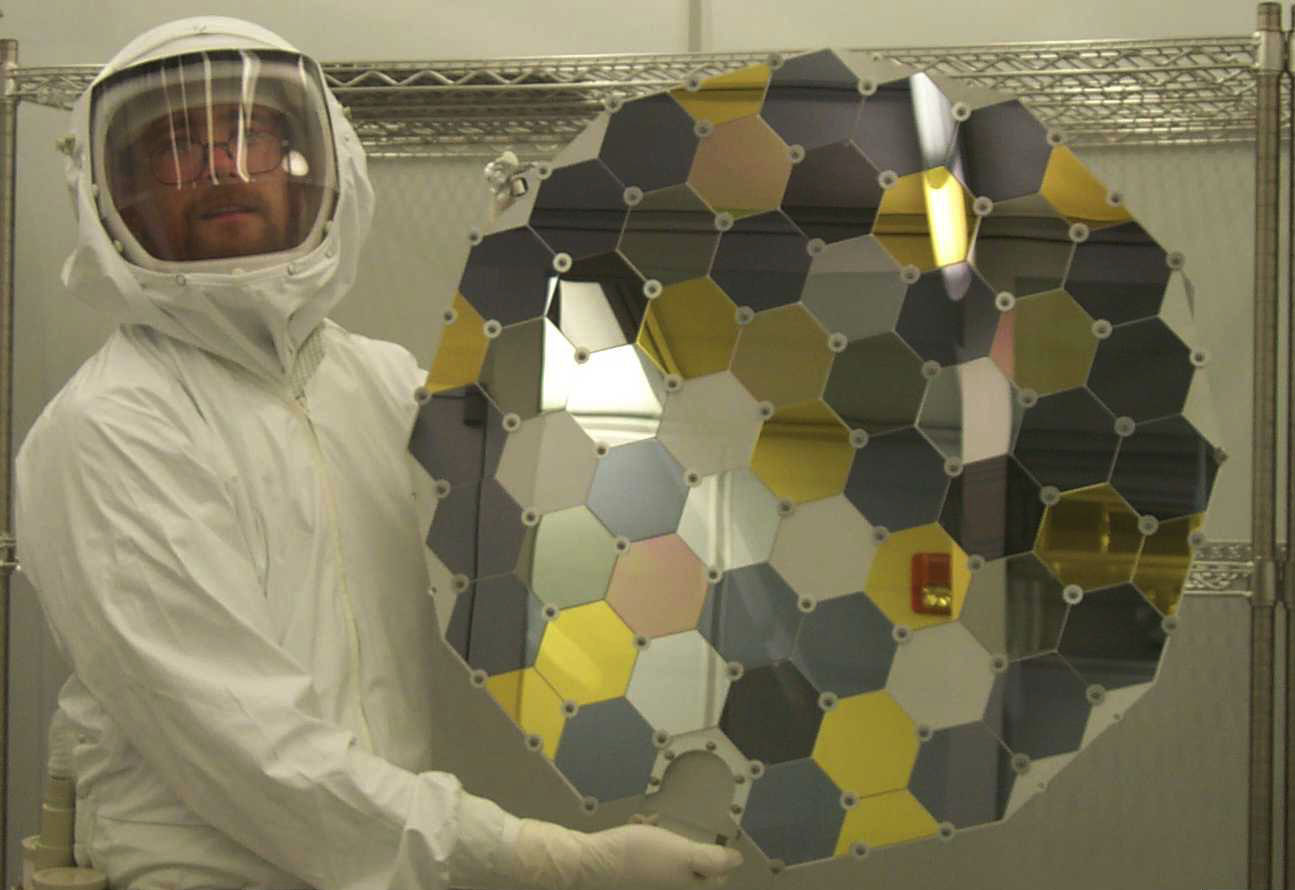
A Genesis collector array in the clean lab at Johnson Space Center. The hexagons consist of a variety of ultra-pure, semiconductor-grade wafers, including silicon, corundum, gold on sapphire, diamond-like carbon films, and other materials.

- August 8
  - The Genesis probe is launched from Cape Canaveral Space Launch Complex 17.
  - Albanian rebels ambush a convoy of the Army of the Republic of Macedonia near Tetovo, North Macedonia, killing 10 soldiers.
- August 9 – A Sbarro restaurant in Jerusalem is bombed by a Palestinian Hamas terrorist, killing 15 civilians and injuring 130 others.
- August 10
  - 2001 Angola train attack: 252 people are killed by UNITA in an attack on a train during the Angolan Civil War.
  - The United States and the United Kingdom bomb air force installations in Iraq in response to attacks on American and British planes.
- August 13 – Macedonian and Albanian representatives sign the Ohrid Agreement to reduce conflicts during the insurgency.
- August 21 – Operation Essential Harvest: NATO sends a military forces to the Republic of Macedonia in response to the ongoing insurgency.
- August 25 – 2001 Marsh Harbour Cessna 402 crash: Eight people including singer and actress Aaliyah, and several members of her entourage are killed after their overloaded aircraft crashes shortly after takeoff at Marsh Harbour Airport.
- August 28 – A targeted Israeli strike kills PFLP leader Abu Ali Mustafa. Palestinian militants respond by firing on Israeli civilians. Israeli forces occupy Beit Jala, Palestine to combat the militants.
- August 31 – The World Conference against Racism 2001 begins in Durban, South Africa. Israel and the United States withdraw three days later, alleging antisemitism in the conference.

=== September ===
- September 7 – 2001 Jos riots: Clashes between Christian and Muslim rioters begin in Jos, Nigeria. The conflict will continue until September 17, during which time hundreds of people will be killed.
- September 9 – A suicide bomber kills Ahmad Shah Massoud, military commander of the Afghan Northern Alliance.

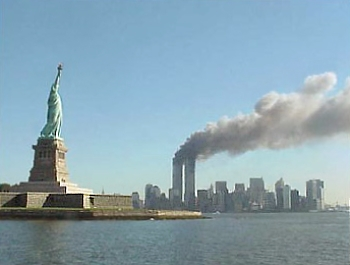
The World Trade Center and the Statue of Liberty during the September 11 attacks in New York City

- September 11 – Approximately 2,977 people (not including 19 terrorists) are killed or fatally injured in the September 11 attacks after two Boeing 767s, American Airlines Flight 11 and United Airlines Flight 175, are hijacked and crashed into the Twin Towers of the World Trade Center. Two Boeing 757s, American Airlines Flight 77 and United Airlines Flight 93, are also hijacked. Flight 77 crashes into the Pentagon and Flight 93 crashes into grassland in Shanksville, Pennsylvania as a result of passengers fighting to regain control of the airplane. The Twin Towers collapse as a result of the burning jet fuel from the crashes.
- September 17 – George W. Bush, president of the United States, delivers remarks at the Islamic Center of Washington praising Muslim Americans and condemning Islamophobia in the aftermath of the September 11 attacks.
- September 18 – The 2001 anthrax attacks begin in the United States, which cause five fatalities and 17 other infections.
- September 19 – Palestinian leader Yasser Arafat forbids Palestinian soldiers from firing on Israeli forces, even in self-defence. Israel agrees to a ceasefire.
- September 20 – In an address to a joint session of Congress, U.S. President George W. Bush declares a war on terror, officially the global war on terrorism.
- September 22 – American spacecraft Deep Space 1 flies within 2,200 kilometres (1,400 mi) of Comet Borrelly.
- September 24 – A tornado outbreak tears through the eastern United States, causing two deaths and 57 injuries, and causing damages of $105 million.
- September 27 – Zug massacre: In Zug, Switzerland, a gunman shoots 32 people, killing 14 members of parliament and then himself.

=== October ===
- October 1
  - Jaish-e-Mohammed militants attack the state legislature building in Srinagar, Kashmir, killing 38 people.
  - 3G wireless technology first becomes available when it is adopted by Japanese telecommunications company NTT Docomo.

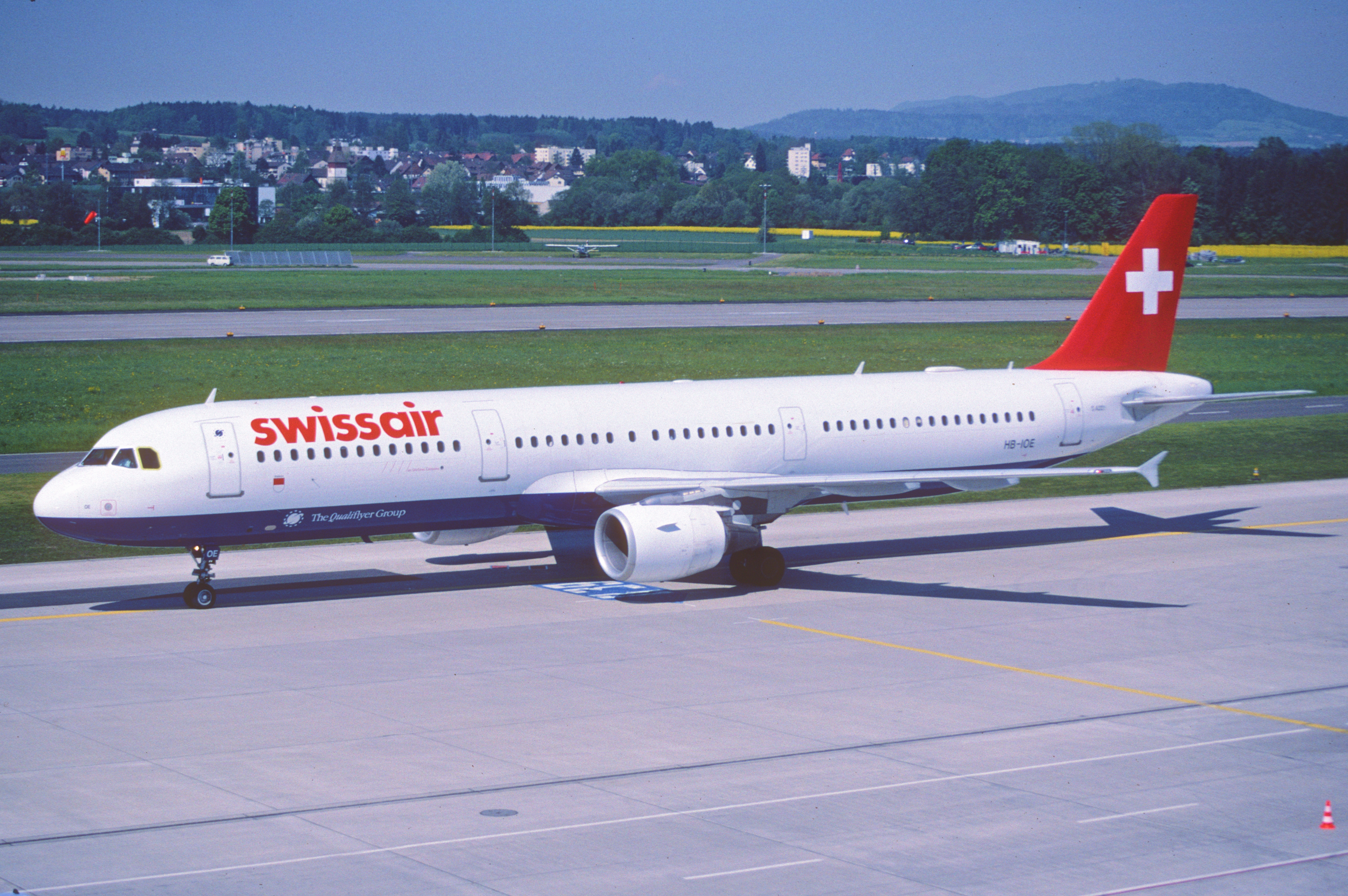
Swissair Airbus A321-100 (2001)

- October 2 – Swissair, the national airline of Switzerland, seeks bankruptcy protection and grounds its entire fleet, stranding thousands of people worldwide.
- October 4
  - Siberia Airlines Flight 1812 is accidentally shot down by the Ukrainian Air Force over the Black Sea en route from Tel Aviv, Israel, to Novosibirsk, Russia; all 78 people on board are killed.
  - 2001 Kodori crisis: Fighting escalates between Georgia and the breakaway state Abkhazia.
- October 7 – United States invasion of Afghanistan: In response to the September 11 attacks, Afghanistan is invaded by a US-led coalition, beginning the War in Afghanistan.
- October 8
  - 2001 Linate Airport runway collision: A twin-engine Cessna and Scandinavian Airlines jetliner collide in heavy fog during takeoff from Milan, Italy, killing 118 people.
  - Hurricane Iris hits Belize, causing $250 million (2001 USD) in damage.
- October 13 – American scientists create the first successful clone of a human embryo.
- October 15 – NASA's Galileo spacecraft passes within 181 kilometres (112 mi) of Jupiter's moon Io.
- October 16 – American planes misidentify and bomb a Red Cross facility in Afghanistan. A similar error occurs again on October 27.
- October 17 – Assassination of Rehavam Ze'evi: Israeli tourism minister Rehavam Ze'evi is assassinated by the Popular Front for the Liberation of Palestine.
- October 23
  - Apple Inc. introduces the iPod, a portable media player and multi-purpose mobile device. The company will sell an estimated 450 million iPod products by May 2022.
  - The Provisional Irish Republican Army begins disarmament, ending a decades-long conflict in Northern Ireland.
- October 24 – The 2001 Mars Odyssey arrives at Mars.
- October 25
  - To avoid connotations with the Rwandan genocide, the government of Rwanda adopts a new national flag for the country.
  - Microsoft releases the Windows XP operating system to retail.
- October 30
  - The Aarhus Convention takes effect, establishing the right to environmental information and environmental justice for European and Central Asian countries.
  - Michael Jackson releases the album Invincible, it was his last studio album to be released during his lifetime before his death; 8 years later in June 2009.

=== November ===
- November – The World Trade Organization begins the Doha Development Round to negotiate lower trade barriers between countries and integrate developing nations into the global economy.
- November 1 – An interim government in Burundi begins the peace process for the Burundian Civil War.
- November 4 – Hurricane Michelle hits Cuba, where the storm is the strongest tropical cyclone to make landfall on the island in more than 49 years. It is the costliest hurricane in Cuban history to this point with an estimated $2 billion in damage.
- November 7 – Sabena, the national airline of Belgium, goes bankrupt.
- November 9 – 2001 Special Operations Unit mutiny: In Yugoslavia, the Special Operations Unit mutinies in opposition to the government's cooperation with the ICTY.
- November 10
  - 2001 Australian federal election: The Coalition government, led by John Howard, is re-elected with a slightly increased majority, defeating the Labor Party led by Kim Beazley.
  - Fall of Mazar-i-Sharif: American and Northern Alliance forces take Mazar-i-Sharif in the first major offensive of the War in Afghanistan.
- November 11 – Two French journalists, Pierre Billaud and Johanne Sutton, and a German colleague, Volker Handloik, are killed in Afghanistan during an attack on their convoy.
- November 12
  - American Airlines Flight 587 crashes in Belle Harbor, Queens, on the Rockaway Peninsula shortly after takeoff, killing all 260 people aboard the plane as well as five people on the ground.
  - 2001 uprising in Herat: Northern Alliance forces take the city of Herat from the Taliban.
- November 14
  - Fall of Kabul: Northern Alliance forces take the Afghan capital Kabul.
  - A 7.8-magnitude earthquake strikes China with an epicenter near Kokoxili, but it occurs in a sparsely populated mountainous region and there are no casualties.
- November 15 – Microsoft enters the gaming console market with the release of the Xbox, a sixth-generation gaming console, in the United States.
- November 18 – The Leonids meteor shower occurs in its heaviest concentration in decades as Earth passes through a debris cloud.
- November 19 - President George W. Bush signs the Aviation and Transportation Security Act into law, shifting airport security from private contractors to a federal workforce.
- November 23 – The Budapest Convention on Cybercrime, the first international treaty to address cybercrime, is signed in Budapest, Hungary.

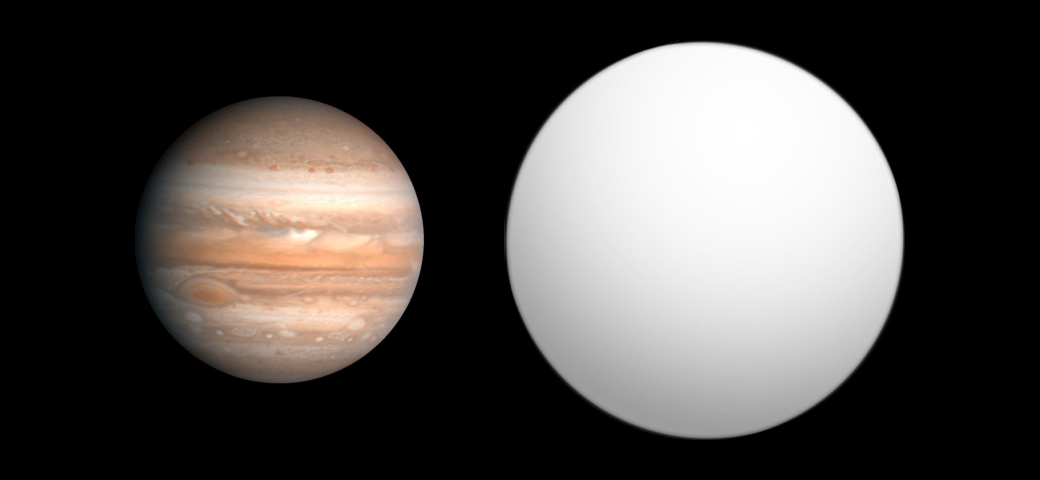
Size comparison of HD 209458 b with Jupiter (left)

- November 27 – A hydrogen atmosphere is discovered on the extrasolar planet HD 209458 b, nicknamed Osiris, by the Hubble Space Telescope. It is the first atmosphere detected on an extrasolar planet.

=== December ===
- December – Dasht-i-Leili massacre: Hundreds of Taliban prisoners are killed by the forces of Abdul Rashid Dostum.
- December 1
  - The International Commission on Intervention and State Sovereignty produces a report on responsibility to protect.
  - A series of bombings in Zion Square are carried out by Hamas. Ten people are killed and hundreds more are injured.
- December 2
  - Enron files for Chapter 11 bankruptcy protection five days after Dynegy cancels a US$8.4 billion buyout bid (to this point, the largest bankruptcy in U.S. history).
  - Haifa bus 16 suicide bombing: A Hamas militant carries out a suicide bombing in Haifa, Israel, killing 15 people.
- December 3 – The Segway, a self-balancing personal transporter invented by Dean Kamen, is unveiled after months of public speculation and media hype on the ABC News morning program Good Morning America.
- December 5 – 2001 Sayyd Alma Kalay airstrike: An American airstrike mistakenly targets a friendly position, killing 11 people in a friendly fire incident.
- December 6 – Fall of Kandahar: The Taliban surrenders in Kandahar, its final stronghold.
- December 8 – An ebola outbreak is confirmed in Gabon.
- December 11 – China joins the World Trade Organization.
- December 13
  - 2001 Indian Parliament attack: Nine people and five terrorists are killed in a terrorist attack in New Delhi, leading to the 2001–2002 India–Pakistan standoff.
  - U.S. President George W. Bush announces the American withdrawal from the 1972 Anti-Ballistic Missile Treaty.
  - Sirajuddin of Perlis becomes the Yang di-Pertuan Agong, the constitutional monarch and head of state of Malaysia.
- December 15 – The Leaning Tower of Pisa is reopened to the public after 12 years of reconstruction.
- December 17 – Battle of Tora Bora: American forces take Tora Bora, a cave complex and the headquarters of Al-Qaeda in Afghanistan. Al-Qaeda leader Osama bin Laden escapes during the battle and goes into hiding.
- December 19 – A record-high barometric pressure of 1085.6 hPa (32.06 inHg) is recorded at Tosontsengel, Zavkhan, Mongolia.
- December 21 – President Fernando de la Rúa of Argentina resigns in response to the riots against Argentina's economic crisis.

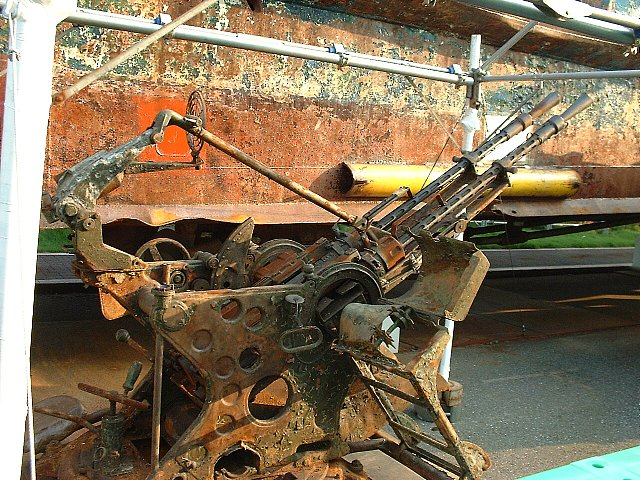
A ZPU-2 anti-aircraft gun that was mounted on the North Korean vessel sunk in the Battle of Amami-Ōshima

- December 22
  - Battle of Amami-Ōshima: A Japan Coast Guard ship and an armed North Korean vessel engage in conflict near the Japanese island of Amami Ōshima, in the East China Sea. The encounter ends in the sinking of the North Korean vessel that is later determined to have been a spy craft by the Japanese authorities.
  - Burhanuddin Rabbani, political leader of the Northern Alliance, hands over power in Afghanistan to the interim government headed by President Hamid Karzai.
- December 24 – The Constitution of the Comoros is amended, creating a federal government with a rotating presidency and granting increased autonomy to the three island administrations.
- December 27
  - China is granted permanent normal trade status with the United States.
  - Tropical Storm Vamei forms within 1.5 degrees of the equator. No other tropical cyclone in recorded history has come as close to the equator.

== Nobel Prizes ==

- Physics – Eric Allin Cornell, Wolfgang Ketterle, and Carl Wieman
- Chemistry – William Standish Knowles, Ryōji Noyori, and Karl Barry Sharpless
- Medicine – Leland H. Hartwell, Tim Hunt, and Paul Nurse
- Literature – V. S. Naipaul
- Peace – United Nations, Kofi Annan
- Bank of Sweden Prize in Economic Sciences in Memory of Alfred Nobel – George Akerlof, Michael Spence, and Joseph Stiglitz
