= 2001 Comorian constitutional referendum =

Approval of Comorian constiution

- 23 December 2001

Results
Choice	Votes	%
Yes	128,601	76.99%
No	38,433	23.01%
Valid votes	167,034	96.26%
Invalid or blank votes	6,487	3.74%
Total votes	173,521	100.00%
Registered voters/turnout	230,211	75.37%

A constitutional referendum was held in the Comoros on 23 December 2001. The proposed amendments to the constitution were approved by 77% of voters, with a turnout of 75.4%.

== Background ==
The amendments to the constitution provided for a federal state, with a large degree of autonomy for the three islands Anjouan, Grande Comore and Mohéli, each of which would have their own president and legislature. The national presidency would rotate between the three islands.

== Results ==
Choice	Votes	%
For	128,601	76.99
Against	38,433	23.01
Invalid/blank votes	6,487	–
Total	173,521	100
Registered voters/turnout	230,211	75.37
Source: African Elections Database
