= Haifa bus 16 suicide bombing =

2001 suicide bombing in Haifa, Israel

- Part of the Second Intifada militancy campaign
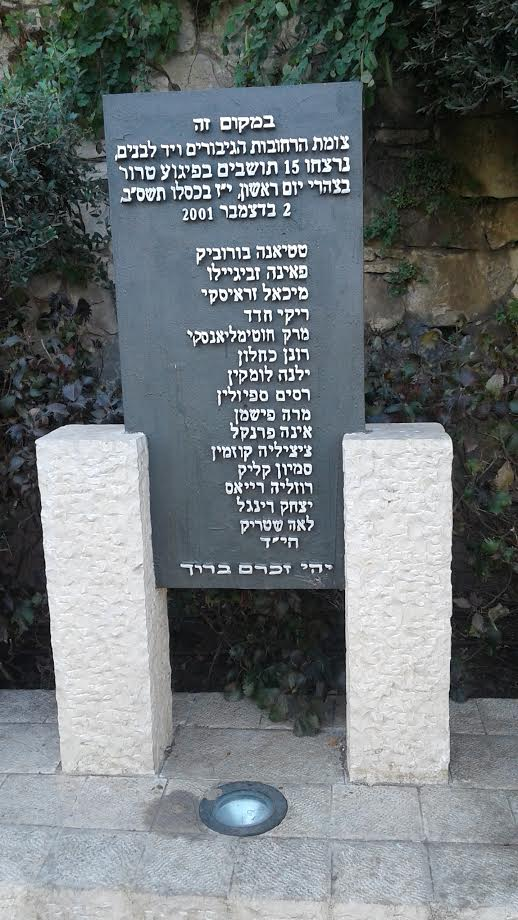
- Memorial for the attack victims

- The attack site
- Native name: הפיגוע בקו 16
- Location: 32°48′04″N 35°00′40″E; Haifa, Israel
- Date: 2 December 2001; 24 years ago c. 12:00 pm (UTC+2)
- Attack type: Suicide bombing
- Weapon: 10 kilograms (22 lb) suicide vest
- Deaths: 15 civilians (+1 bomber)
- Injuries: 40 civilians
- Perpetrator: Hamas claimed responsibility

The Haifa bus 16 suicide bombing was a Palestinian suicide bombing which occurred on 2 December 2001 on an Egged bus in Haifa, Israel. 15 civilians were killed in the attack and 40 were injured.

The Palestinian Islamist militant organization Hamas claimed responsibility for the attack.

== The attack ==
During the afternoon of Sunday, 2 December 2001, the assailant calmly boarded Haifa bus No. 16, which was en route from Neve Sha'anan to the Giborim bridge. The assailant paid the bus fare and a few seconds later detonated the explosive device concealed underneath his clothes. The attack, which occurred in a busy intersection in the Tel Amal neighbourhood in Haifa, killed 15 civilians and injured 40 (17 of them critically).

== The perpetrator ==
Hamas claimed responsibility for the attack. A leaflet published by the Hamas announced that the suicide bomber was Maher Habashi, a 21-year-old Palestinian plumber from Nablus.
