= Kting voar =

Putative species of mammal

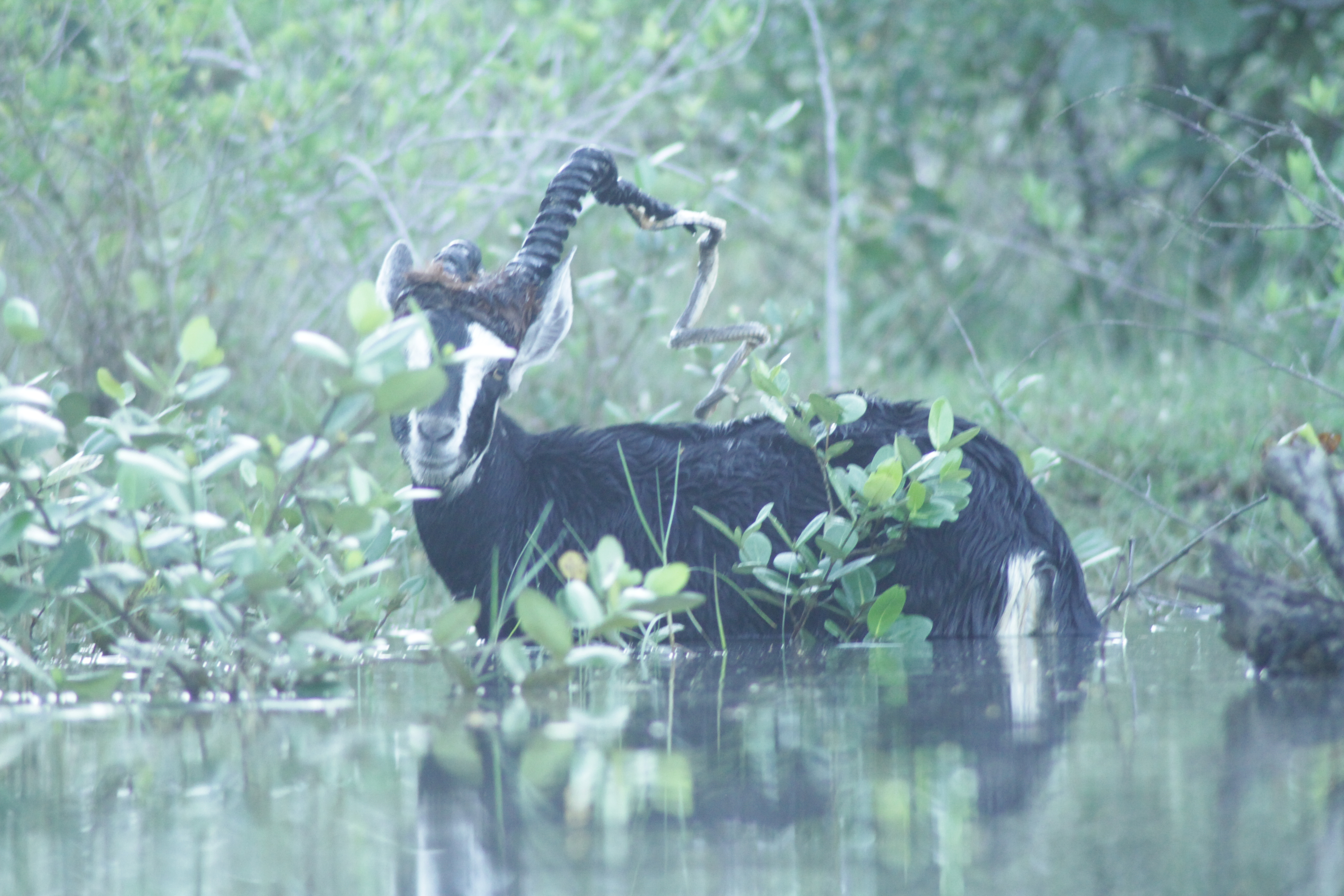
A supposed image of a Kting voar

The kting voar, also known as the khting vor, linh dương, snake-eating cow, and the invalid Latin name Pseudonovibos spiralis, is a bovid mammal reputed to exist in Cambodia and Vietnam. The kting voar's existence as a real species should be regarded as questionable, and it is now thought to simply be a hoax made from water buffalo horns.

== Hoax ==
For Western scientists, the first evidence supporting the kting voar's existence was a set of horns found by biologist Wolfgang Peter in a Ho Chi Minh City market. The horns were so unusual that Peter believed them to belong to a new species.

No anatomical information, except for horns and frontlets, is available, so the phylogenetic status of the kting voar has been uncertain. Peter and Feiler proposed the relationships of P. spiralis with Antilopini, but morphological analyses by Dioli in 1995 and 1997, and Robert Timm and Brandt in 2001 suggest affinities within Bovini, while Nadler and others believe P. spiralis to be related to Caprini. Genetic studies using alleged kting voar specimens have produced confusing results. However, these results from DNA have been demonstrated to be cases of DNA contamination.

All supposed kting voar specimens that were subject to DNA analysis to date have turned out to be artificially shaped cattle horns. The controversy over the existence of P. spiralis was covered in Nature, The New York Times, and Science. Skeptical opinion is that the kting voar is a mythical animal. Cow horns are often sold as imitation kting voar horns in Kampuche markets. However, some scientists, notably American mammalogist Robert Timm, consider it probable that the root of the folklore is a real, distinct species of wild bovid, such as the kouprey.

More recently, Feiler et al. established in 2002 that most of the horn sheaths of the kting voar, including the holotype, were superficially embellished, but added that it remains to be seen whether these horns belong to cattle or a distinct species in its own right. Until further evidence is obtained, the kting voar's existence as a real species is considered questionable.
