= Constitution of the Comoros =

Supreme law of the Comoros

The Constitution of the Union of the Comoros is the supreme law of the Comoros. It was adopted on 23 December 2001 and substantially revised following a referendum on 30 July 2018. The revised text entered into force on 6 August 2018.

== Current constitution ==
The 2018 text contains a preamble and 122 articles addressing fundamental rights, the organisation of the state and its institutions.

The constitution defines the Comoros as a sovereign, unitary and democratic republic. It guarantees equality before the law and fundamental freedoms, and recognises Islam as the state religion, with reference to Sunni and Shafi'i principles. Comorian, French and Arabic are official languages.

The president heads the government and is elected by direct universal suffrage for a five-year term, renewable once. The presidency rotates among the islands, with no island permitted more than two consecutive terms.

The unicameral Assembly of the Union legislates, approves the budget and oversees the government. Deputies serve five-year terms; legislation determines their number. The Supreme Court has jurisdiction over judicial, administrative, constitutional, electoral and audit matters.

Each island has an elected governor and a consultative council. Governors serve five-year terms, renewable once.

Amendments may be proposed by the president or at least one-third of Assembly members. Adoption requires approval by three-quarters of all Assembly members or by referendum.

== Constitutional history ==
=== 1977–1989 ===
A fundamental law was adopted by the National People's Council on 23 April 1977 during the government of Ali Soilih. It declared the Comoros a secular republic and provided for a system of local and national people's committees.

After returning to power in 1978, Ahmed Abdallah introduced a new constitution, which was approved in a referendum on 1 October 1978 with a reported 99 percent of the vote. It established the Federal Islamic Republic of the Comoros and combined island autonomy with strong presidential powers. Each island had its own legislature and authority over taxes levied on resident individuals and businesses. The constitution restored Islam as the state religion while recognising the rights of non-Muslims.

A 1982 amendment replaced the election of island governors with presidential appointment. Amendments in 1985 abolished the office of prime minister, making the president both head of state and head of government. They also transferred responsibility for acting as interim head of state in the event of a presidential vacancy from the president of the Federal Assembly to the president of the Supreme Court.

In the referendum of 5 November 1989, amendments intended to allow Abdallah to seek a third presidential term received an official approval rate of 92.5 percent. Opposition groups alleged electoral irregularities and challenged the referendum's legitimacy. The amendments were not promulgated before Abdallah's assassination later that month and were not implemented.

=== 1992 constitution ===
The Constitution of the Federal Islamic Republic of the Comoros was approved by referendum on 7 June 1992, replacing the constitution of 1978. It provided for a president elected by direct universal suffrage for a five-year term, renewable once, and a prime minister appointed from the party holding a majority in the Federal Assembly. The prime minister directed the government, which was collectively responsible to the Federal Assembly.

The constitution provided for a bicameral legislature. Members of the Federal Assembly were elected for four years. The Senate was to comprise five representatives from each island, elected for six years by an electoral college of municipal and island councillors. The president of the Senate was to act as interim head of state if the presidency became vacant.

Each island had an elected governor and island council, both serving five-year terms. The constitution declared the judiciary independent of the executive and legislature and established a Constitutional Council to review the constitutionality of legislation and supervise elections.

=== 1996 constitution and 1999 constitutional charter ===
A general revision of the constitution, initiated under President Mohamed Taki Abdoulkarim, was approved by referendum on 20 October 1996 and published by presidential decree on 30 October. The revised text provided for a six-year presidential term and a unicameral Federal Assembly elected for five years. It retained the prime minister and established a High Council of the Republic with constitutional and electoral functions. Island governors were appointed by the president from three candidates proposed by each island council.

Following the military coup of 30 April 1999, Colonel Azali Assoumani proclaimed a constitutional charter on 6 May. The charter repealed the 1996 constitution and designated the army's chief of staff as head of state, exercising legislative power through ordinances and executive power through decrees. It provided for its replacement following the adoption of a new constitution by referendum.

=== 2001 constitution ===
The Constitution of the Union of the Comoros was adopted by referendum on 23 December 2001 following a process of national reconciliation. The Fomboni Accords of 17 February 2001 had provided a framework for power-sharing between the Union and the islands following the separatist crisis.

The constitution granted the islands substantial autonomy, including the right to adopt their own fundamental laws within the framework of the Union constitution. The presidency rotated among the islands, with a four-year presidential term. A primary election on the island whose turn it was to hold the presidency selected three candidates for the national election. The president was assisted by two vice-presidents. The constitution also established a Constitutional Court to review legislation, supervise elections, protect fundamental rights and resolve disputes over the distribution of powers between the Union and the islands.

=== 2009 and 2013–2014 amendments ===
A constitutional revision was approved in a referendum on 17 May 2009 and promulgated on 23 May. It extended the presidential term from four to five years while retaining rotation among the islands, increased the number of vice-presidents from two to three, and replaced island presidents with governors. The revision also expressly designated Islam as the state religion and provided for the harmonisation of Union and island elections.

The Assembly adopted further amendments on 26 December 2013, subsequently approved by the island councils. Promulgated in 2014, they changed the timing of elections and the procedure for amending the constitution.

=== 2018 revision ===
A further constitutional revision was approved by referendum on 30 July 2018 and entered into force on 6 August. It abolished the vice-presidencies and the separate Constitutional Court, transferring the latter's functions to the Supreme Court. It also removed the island primary election for the Union presidency and allowed each island to hold the presidency for up to two consecutive five-year terms. Grande Comore, which had held the presidency since 2016, retained its turn for the presidential elections of 2019 and 2024.

The changes enabled Assoumani to seek two further five-year terms, beginning with an early election in 2019. Opposition parties boycotted the referendum and challenged its legality and the official results.
