= Guerrilla phase of the Second Chechen War (2001) =

Part of a Russian war in the Caucasus

== Timeline ==
The Russian military stated that 499 Russian soldiers were killed in Chechnya in 2001.

=== January ===
- January 21, 2001- Chechen fighters in Gudermes killed six russian soldiers
- January 24, 2001 - 14 Russian soldiers were killed across Chechnya.
- January 27, 2001 - 6 Russian soldiers have died and 13 have been wounded in fighting in Chechnya. The deaths come just days after Russia announced it would reduce its vast military deployment in Chechnya.

=== February ===
- February 14, 2001 - 12 Russian soldiers were killed in the attacks on the Russian positions in Chechnya.
- February 18, 2001 - Chechen rebels blew a Russian army logistic truck and killed 3.
- February 23, 2001 - Chechen fighters killed 3 Russian servicemen and wounded 5 on the day marking the anniversary of Joseph Stalin's 1944 deportation of the Chechen and Ingush peoples.

=== March ===
- March 18, 2001 - Chechen fighters killed at least 21 Russian troops across Chechnya.

=== April ===
- April 13, 2001 - Shamalu Deniyev, deputy head of the pro-Russian administration in Chechnya, has been killed in a bomb attack on a television studio.
- April 18, 2001 - Car of the Russian human rights activist Victor Popkov was attacked in Chechnya by unknown assailants. On June 2, 2001 he died of his wounds in a hospital in Krasnogorsk near Moscow.
- April 25, 2001 - At least six Russian policemen were killed and five others wounded when a time bomb ripped through a police building in a Chechen city of Gudermes. The police station housed an Interior Ministry unit fighting organized crime.
- April 26, 2001 - Chechen fighters killed at least 17 Russian soldiers and wounded 28.
- April 30, 2001 - 11 Russian soldiers killed and 18 wounded in fighting against chechen fighters.

=== May ===
- May 4, 2001 - 2 Russian soldiers and 9 Chechen fighters were reported killed in fighting, while the bodies of five Russian civilians were found in the capital Grozny, according to the government military sources. A prominent Chechnya's religious leader, Mullah Nasruddin Matuyev, was shot dead by 2 suspected chechen gunmen when he was returning home from the mosque in the village of Novye Atagi.
- May 7, 2001 - Chechen fighters ambushed a Russian military column which was going to carry out a mopping up operation in Argun, leaving at least 15 Russian soldiers dead. The heavy fighting in and around the town, during which Russian artillery and military helicopters were used, ended on the next day.
- May, 2001 - Chechen Commander Ruslan Alikhadzhyev abducted and later killed by the Russian forces in Shali.

=== June ===
- June 6, 2001 - Local councillour of the village Gekhi-Chu Lema Idrisov was killed in the Urus-Martan district; 17 administration officials and 6 heads of village administrations have been killed in Chechnya in the eight months since January 2001. On June 10, 2001 Lukman Madalov, head of the administration of village Valerik in the Achkhoy-Martan district, was shot dead in his house.
- June 25, 2001 - Russian special forces (spetznaz) killed Arbi Barayev, a Chechen commander and warlord, and up to 20 of his fighters in a week-long cleansing operation in the village of Alkhan-Kala, near Grozny. Some 800 local villagers were taken into the custody.
- June 26, 2001 - Russian troops claimed to have killed at least 30 Chechen rebels near the Georgian border.

=== July ===
- July 1, 2001 - A remote controlled mine or ied bomb blew up a jeep carrying 5 russian policemen in Sernovodsk, Chechnya, killing all of them.
- July 2, 2001 - 6 Russian army soldiers died when their armored personnel carrier was blown up by a mine or IED outside the village of Assinovskaya, Ingushetiya.
- July 3, 2001 - 3 russian policemen were killed in a bomb and sniper attack in Chechnya, while the Russian forces organized a massive sweep operation in the search of suspected fighters and their accomplices.
- July 20, 2001 - An Interior Ministry helicopter explodes near Engenoi, killing 9 MVD commandos and wounding five.
- July 22, 2001 - Nine russian soldiers were killed and 24 wounded in land mine explosions and rebel attacks in Chechnya. Four of them were killed and 11 wounded in a rebel ied bomb and machine gunfire attack/abush on a Russian armoured personnel carrier.

=== August ===
- August 11, 2001 - 6 Russian policemen were killed and nine injured in Chechnya by in the blast of remote-controlled bomb detonated under their armoured vehicle. 11 other soldiers were wounded during a gun battle in the Vedensky District region south-east of Grozny after a convoy came under fire, and military said three chechen fighters were killed.
- August 13, 2001 - A large force of insurgents attacked the Vedeno region. The fighting, reportedly heaviest since 2000, continued for at least several days. There were reports of a shot down Russian helicopters and the use of SCUD missiles, as well as wounding of Shamil Basayev.
- August 26, 2001 - A military helicopter fired on a group of Chechen policemen, killing two and wounding four in an allegedly deliberate attack.
- August 29, 2001 - Insurgent car bomb attack against a Russian military convoy in the village of Oktyabrskoye in Kurchaloyevsky District killed 4 soldiers and wounded 6; the Russian military claimed that it had captured three rebels involved the attack. A night-time blast of a radio-controlled mine placed at a police checkpoint in the Kurchaloi district killed two other soldiers and injured 11 people. 2 policemen were killed and 3 wounded in the coordinated rebel gun attacks in the villages of Tsa-Vedeno and Makhketi.
- August 30, 2001 - Two rebel bombings and several gun attacks killed two servicemen and wounded 15 in Chechnya, including two injured when a T-62 was tank blown up by a land mine at the settlement of Gikalovsky.

=== September ===
- September 10, 2001 - Lecha Kadyrov, a nephew the head of Chechnya's pro-Moscow administration Akhmad Kadyrov, and three of his companions were shot dead near Kurchaloy, east Chechnya, after attackers fired at their car.
- September 17, 2001 - Chechen fighters carried out a large counter-attack or assault in towns of Gudermes and Argun, in Nozhay-Yurtovsky District, involving between 100 and 400 fighters. At the time of the attacks Gudermes had been functioning as a de facto capital of Chechnya. An attack at Gudermes left 10 Russian soldiers dead; 15 rebels were reported killed.
- September 17, 2001 - A surface-to-air missile shot down a VIP Mi-8 helicopter over Grozny, killing Major-General Anatoli Pozdnyakov, member of the General Staff of the Russian Armed Forces, Major-General Pavel Varfolomeyev, deputy director of staff of the Defence Ministry of Russia, eight colonels, and three crewmembers. (see 2001 Grozny Mi-8 crash)
- September 20, 2001 - Seven policemen, including local police chief, were killed during an attack between villages Kurchaloi and Mayrtup.
- September 30, 2001 - Two policemen were killed and 14 wounded in the rebel attack on police buildings in Kurchaloi.

=== October ===
- October 16, 2001 - Ten Russian soldiers were killed in Chechnya, including four killed by IEDs in Grozny, another three in a convoy ambush in southern Shalinsky District and at least two in attacks on the Russian outposts across the republic. In retaliation, Russian aircraft attacked suspected insurgent camps in the mountains and launched a search for suspected militants in several southern villages.

=== November ===
- November 29, 2001 - A young Chechen woman, Elza Gazuyeva, carried out an assassination attempt on the Urus-Martan military district commandant, identified only as General Geydar Gadzhiev, blowing herself up with a hand grenade near a group of Russian soldiers. Gazuyeva had lost a husband, two brothers, and a cousin in the war. Gadzhiev, who was accused of atrocities against civilians by locals, reportedly had personally summoned Elza to witness her husband's and brother's torture and execution. He and several other soldiers later died of their wounds.

=== December ===
- December 30, 2001 - A four-day battle and cleansing operation in the large village of Tsotsin-Yurt, south of Grozny, reportedly results in dozens of deaths among chechen fighters and civilians, including 11 locals who vanished after being detained by the Russian forces.
