= Kolokol-1 =

Toxic chemical agent used by Russian special forces

Kolokol-1 (Russian: ко́локол for "bell"; pronounced [ˈkoɫəkəɫ]) is a synthetic opioid developed for use as an aerosolizable incapacitating agent. The exact chemical structure has not yet been revealed by the Russian government. It was originally thought by some sources to be a derivative of the potent opioid fentanyl, most probably 3-methylfentanyl dissolved in an inhalational anaesthetic as an organic solvent. However, independent analysis of residues on the Moscow theater hostage crisis hostages' clothing or in one hostage's urine found no fentanyl or 3-methylfentanyl. Two much more potent and shorter-acting agents, carfentanil (a large animal tranquilizer) and remifentanil (a surgical painkiller), were found in the samples. They concluded that the agent used in the Moscow theater hostage crisis contained two fentanyl derivatives much stronger than fentanyl itself, sprayed in an aerosol mist.

== Development and early use ==
According to Lev Fyodorov, a former Soviet chemical weapons scientist who now heads the independent Council for Chemical Security in Moscow, the agent was originally developed at a secret military research facility in Leningrad (now restored to its historic name of Saint Petersburg), during the 1970s. Methods of dispersing the compound were reportedly developed and tested by releasing harmless bacteria through subway system ventilation shafts, first in Moscow and then in Novosibirsk. Fyodorov also claimed that leaders of the failed August 20, 1991, Communist coup considered using the agent in the Russian parliament building.

== Use during Moscow theater hostage crisis ==
Kolokol-1 is thought to be the chemical agent employed by a Russian Spetsnaz team during the Moscow theater hostage crisis in October 2002. At least 129 hostages died during the ensuing raid; nearly all of these fatalities were attributed to the effects of the aerosolised incapacitating agent that was pumped into the theatre to subdue the militants. The gas was later stated by Russian Health Minister Yuri Shevchenko to be based on fentanyl. Minister Shevchenko's statement followed speculation that the gas employed at the theater violated international prohibitions on the manufacture and use of lethal chemical weapons, and came after a request for clarification about the gas from Rogelio Pfirter, director-general of the Organisation for the Prohibition of Chemical Weapons. The minister stressed that the drug fentanyl used in the gas, which is widely used as a pain medication, "cannot in itself be called lethal".

Shevchenko attributed the hostage deaths to the use of the chemical compound on the poor physical condition of the victims after three days of captivity - dehydrated, hungry, lacking oxygen and suffering acute stress, saying "I officially declare that chemical substances of the kind banned under international conventions on chemical weapons were not used," according to the Interfax news agency.

This comment is disputed on two grounds. First, the United States Ambassador to Russia at the time complained that delays on the part of the Russian government in identifying the exact nature of the active agent in the gas led to many hostage deaths which might otherwise have been avoided. Second, a team of researchers based at the United Kingdom's chemical and biological defense laboratories at Porton Down, Wiltshire, England, subjected residues of the gas from clothing worn by two British survivors, and urine from a third survivor who survived the gas attack after hospital treatment to liquid chromatography–tandem mass spectrometry analysis. They found no fentanyl, but did find two other, much more potent and potentially toxic drugs, carfentanil and remifentanil.

The specific antidote for carfentanil is naloxone. This report goes on to state

- carfentanil is only approved as a veterinary drug for use in sedating large animals such as elephants, not for use in humans because the effective dose is unacceptably close to the dose which can cause illness or death;
- that the deaths among hostages after the Moscow theater can be explained by the use of carfentanil and remifentanil, two strong drugs for which there is little margin of safety between sedative and lethal doses in humans. Many deaths could have been expected unless the people exposed got quick treatment with the drugs' antidotes.
- that it is highly unlikely a chemical agent can be used in a tactical environment to disable opponents reliably without many deaths.

An article in the Annals of Emergency Medicine compared the sedating dose and the toxic or lethal dose of fentanyl and those of its derivatives and found that while carfentanil and remifentanil have dramatically shorter biological half-lives and are more potent than fentanyl, the fentanyl derivatives are lipophilic (readily taken up into body fat) and can re-enter the circulation after an overdose is first treated, causing severe delayed effects and even death if the correct antidote is not administered when the drugs act again. This might account for the large number of deaths following use of large amounts of Kolokol-1 in a closed space like the Barricade Theatre, where the gas might have been unexpectedly concentrated in areas of the theater.

Under the heading "Lessons Learned," the authors state "It seems likely that the 800 hostages were about to be killed by Chechen rebels. To rescue them, the Russian military used a calmative agent in an attempt to subdue the rebels. The intent was likely to win control of the theater with as little loss of life as possible. Given the large number of explosives in the hands of the hostage takers, a conventional assault or the use of more toxic chemical agents might have significantly increased the number of casualties. Although it may seem excessive that 16% of the 800 hostages may have died from the gas exposure, 84% survived. We do not know that a different tactic would have provided a better outcome."

The authors said that the high therapeutic index of one of the fentanyl derivatives used may have inappropriately reduced the Russian government's concern about the potential lethality of these agents, the drugs' lipophilicity, and how the hostages could have been overdosed in the enclosed space of the theater as factors that should have been considered more thoroughly. They concluded by saying that poisoning by opioid agonist drugs such as Kolokol-1 is relatively simple to treat, and that many of the deaths after the Moscow theater hostage crisis could have been avoided if trained rescuers and medical teams with the proper antidotes were made ready in advance. They stated that naloxone, long a critical antidote to treat heroin overdose and unintentional poisoning with opioids during medical treatment, "has now become a crucial chemical warfare antidote."

== Carfentanil ==
Carfentanil, one of the two fentanyl derivatives used in the Moscow theater hostage crisis was actively marketed by several Chinese chemical companies at the time. Carfentanil was not a controlled substance in China, where it was manufactured legally and sold openly over the Internet up until May 1, 2017, when a ban on fentanyl and all fentanyl analogues went into effect. There has been controversy between the US and China over whether the Chinese ban on sales of fentanyl derivatives to the US has been effective. Fentanyl led to more than 37,000 overdose deaths in the US in 2017.

The toxicity of carfentanil has been compared with nerve gas, according to an Associated Press article. The article quoted Andrew C. Weber, Assistant US Secretary of Defense for Nuclear, Chemical and Biological Defense Programs from 2009 to 2014 as saying "It's a weapon. Companies shouldn't be just sending it to anybody." Weber added, "Countries that we are concerned about were interested in using it for offensive purposes ... We are also concerned that groups like ISIS could order it commercially." Weber described various ways carfentanil could be used as a weapon, such as knocking troops out and taking them hostage, or killing civilians in closed spaces like train stations.
