= Incapacitating agent =

Non-lethal chemical or biological weapon

Incapacitating agent is a chemical or biological agent which renders a person unable to harm themselves or others, regardless of consciousness.

Lethal agents are primarily intended to kill, but incapacitating agents can also kill if administered in a potent enough dose, or in certain scenarios.

The term "incapacitation," when used in a general sense, is not equivalent to the term "disability" as used in occupational medicine and denotes the inability to perform a task because of a quantifiable physical or mental impairment. In this sense, any of the chemical warfare agents may incapacitate a victim; however, by the military definition of this type of agent, incapacitation refers to impairments that are temporary and nonlethal. Thus, riot-control agents are incapacitating because they cause temporary loss of vision due to blepharospasm, but they are not considered military incapacitants because the loss of vision does not last long. Although incapacitation may result from physiological changes such as mucous membrane irritation, diarrhea, or hyperthermia, the term "incapacitating agent" as militarily defined refers to a compound that produces temporary and nonlethal impairment of military performance by virtue of its psychobehavioral or CNS effects.

In biological warfare, a distinction is also made between bio-agents as Lethal Agents (e.g., Bacillus anthracis, Francisella tularensis, Botulinum toxin) or Incapacitating Agents (e.g., Brucella suis, Coxiella burnetii, Venezuelan equine encephalitis virus, Staphylococcal enterotoxin B).

== History ==
=== Early uses ===
The use of chemicals to induce altered states of mind in an adversary dates back to antiquity and includes the use of plants of the nightshade family (Solanaceae), such as the thornapple (Datura stramonium), that contain various combinations of anticholinergic alkaloids. The use of nonlethal chemicals to render an enemy force incapable of fighting dates back to at least 600 B.C. when Solon's soldiers threw hellebore roots into streams supplying water to enemy troops, who then developed diarrhea. In 184 B.C., Hannibal's army used belladonna plants to induce disorientation, and the Bishop of Münster in A.D. 1672 attempted to use belladonna-containing grenades in an assault on the city of Groningen.

In 1881, members of a French railway surveying expedition crossing Tuareg territory in North Africa ate dried dates that tribesmen had apparently deliberately contaminated with Egyptian henbane (Hyoscyamus muticus, or H. falezlez), to devastating effect. In 1908, 200 French soldiers in Hanoi became delirious and experienced hallucinations after being poisoned with a related plant. More recently, accusations of Soviet use of incapacitating agents internally and in Afghanistan were never substantiated.

=== The 20th century ===
Following World War II, the United States military investigated a wide range of possible nonlethal, psychobehavioral, chemical incapacitating agents to include psychedelic indoles such as lysergic acid diethylamide (LSD-25) and the tetrahydrocannabinol derivative DMHP, certain tranquilizers, as well as several glycolate anticholinergics. One of the anticholinergic compounds, 3-quinuclidinyl benzilate, was assigned the NATO code "BZ" and was weaponized beginning in the 1960s for possible battlefield use. (Although BZ figured prominently in the plot of the 1990 movie, Jacob's Ladder, as the compound responsible for hallucinations and violent deaths in a fictitious American battalion in Vietnam, this agent never saw operational use.) Destruction of American stockpiles of BZ began in 1988 and is now complete.

==== US survey and testing programs ====
By 1958 a search of the tropics for venomous animal species in order to isolate and synthesize their toxins was prioritized. For example, snake venoms were studied and The College of Medical Evangelists was under contract to isolate puffer fish poison. The New England Institute for Medical Research and Fort Detrick were studying the properties and biological activity of the Botulinum toxin molecule. The U.S. Army Chemical Warfare Laboratories were isolating shellfish toxin and trying to obtain its structure.

A Central Intelligence Agency Project Artichoke document reads: "Not all viruses have to be lethal ... the objective includes those that act as short-term and long-term incapacitants." One of the most urgent of Chemical Corps projects in the period 1960 to 1961 was the effort to achieve a standard chemical incapacitating agent. For several years attention had been fixed on the military potentialities of the psychochemicals of various types. Research on new agents tended to concentrate on viral and rickettsial diseases. A whole range of exotic virus diseases prevalent in tropical areas came within the screening program in 1960–61, with major effort directed at increased first hand knowledge of so-called arboviruses (i.e. arthropod borne viruses). The importance of epidemiological studies in connection with this area of endeavor was being emphasized. Pine Bluff Arsenal was a rickittsiae and virus production center and biological agents against wheat and rice fields were tested in several locations the southern U.S. as well as in Okinawa.

The concept of "humane warfare" with widespread use of incapacitating or deliriant drugs such as LSD or Agent BZ to stun an enemy, capture them alive, or separate friend from foe had been available in locations such as Berlin since the 1950s, an initial focus of US CBW development was the offensive use of diseases, drugs, and substances that could completely incapacitate an enemy for several days with some lesser possibility of death using a variety of chemical, biological, radiological, or toxin agents. The US Army Assistant Chief of Staff for Intelligence (ACSI) authorized operational field testing of LSD in interrogations in the early 1960s. The first field tests were conducted in Europe by an Army Special Purpose Team (SPT) during May to August 1961 in tests known as Project THIRD CHANCE. The second series of field tests, Project DERBY HAT, were conducted by an Army Special Purpose Team in the Far East during August to November 1962.

A study of possible uses of migratory birds in germ warfare was funded through Camp Detrick for years using the Smithsonian as a cover. Government documents have linked the Smithsonian to the CIA's mind control program known as MKULTRA. The CIA were interested in bird migration patterns for CBW research under MKULTRA where, a Subproject 139 designated "Bird Disease Studies" at Pennsylvania State University. An agents purchase of a copy of the book Birds of Britain, Europe, is recorded as part of what was described in a financial accounting of the MKULTRA program as a continuous project on bird survey in special areas. Sampling of native migratory organisms with a focus on birds provided to researchers the natural habitat of disease causing fungus, viruses, and bacteria as well as the established (or potential) vectors for them. The sampling also provided exotic tropical viruses and toxins from the various organisms collected on both land and sea. The studies, including the Pacific Ocean Biological Survey Program (POBSP) were conducted by the Smithsonian Institution and Project SHAD crews on Pacific islands and atolls. The "bird cruises" were subsequently found to be a U.S. Army cover for the prelude to chemical, biological, and entomological warfare experiments related to Deseret Test Center, Project 112, and Project SHAD.

A U.S. War Departments report notes that "in addition to the results of human experimentation much data is available from the Japanese experiments on animals and food crops." German researchers have found that records of the Entomology Institute at the Dachau concentration camp show that under orders of Schutzstaffel (SS) leader Heinrich Himmler, the Nazis began studying mosquitoes as an offensive biological warfare vector against humans in 1942. It was generally thought by historians that the Nazis only intended ever to use biological weapons defensively.

Project 112 included objectives such as “the feasibility of an offshore release of Aedes aegypti mosquitoes as a vector for infectious diseases,” and “the feasibility of a biological attack against an island complex.” "The feasibility of area coverage with adedes aegypti mosquitoes was based on the Avon Park, Florida mosquito trials." Several CIA documents, and a 1975 Congressional committee, revealed that several locations in Florida, as well as Avon Park, hosted experiments with mosquito-borne viruses and other biological substances. Formerly top-secret documents related to the CIA's Project MKNAOMI prove that the mosquitoes used in Avon Park were the Aedes aegypti type. "A 1978 Pentagon publication, entitled Biological Warfare: Secret Testing & Volunteers, reveals that the Army's Chemical Corps and Special Operations and Projects Divisions at Fort Detrick conducted 'tests' similar to the Avon Park experiments but the bulk of the documentation concerning this highly classified and covert work is still held secret by the Pentagon."

== Sleeping gas ==
Sleeping gas is an oneirogenic general anaesthetic that is used to put subjects into a state in which they are not conscious of what is happening around them. Most sleeping gases have undesirable side effects, or are effective at doses that approach toxicity.

It is primarily used for major surgeries and to render non-dangerous animals unconscious for research purposes.

Examples of modern volatile anaesthetics that may be considered sleeping gases are BZ, halothane vapour (Fluothane), methyl propyl ether (Neothyl), methoxyflurane (Penthrane), and the undisclosed fentanyl derivative delivery system used by the FSB in the Moscow theater hostage crisis.

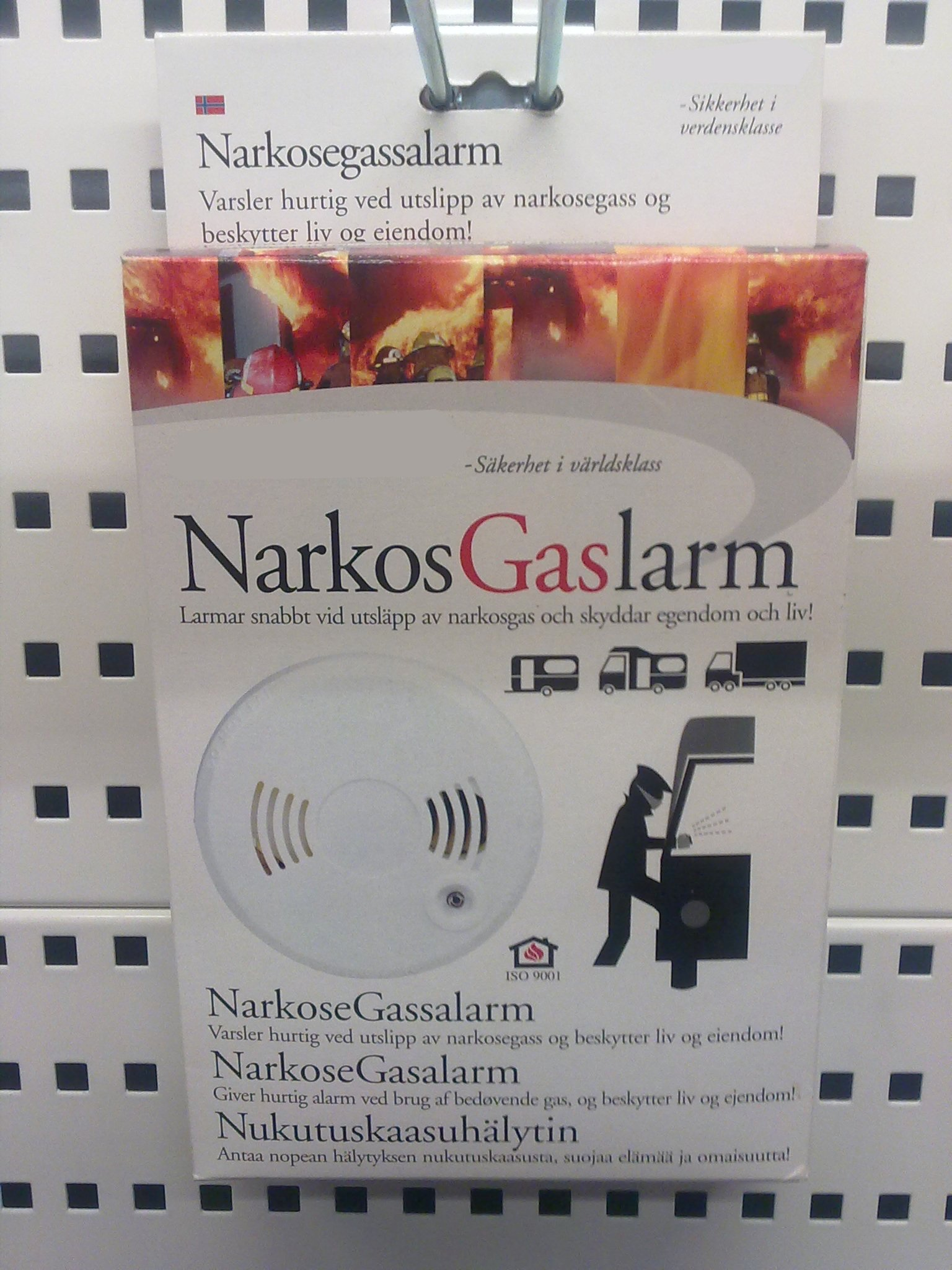
Picture of a sleeping gas alarm on sale in Finland.

=== Side effects ===
Possible side effects might not prevent use of sleeping gas by criminals willing to murder, or carefully control the dose on a single already sleepy individual. There are reports of thieves spraying sleeping gases on campers, or in train compartments in some parts of Europe. Alarms are sold to detect such attacks and alert the victim.

=== Moscow theatre siege ===
There is one documented case of incapacitating agents being used in recent years. In 2002, Chechen terrorists took a large number of hostages in the Moscow theatre siege, and threatened to blow up the entire theatre if any attempt was made to break the siege. An incapacitating agent was used to disable the terrorists whilst the theatre was stormed by special forces. However, the incapacitating agent, unknown at that time, caused many of the hostages to die. The terrorists were rendered unconscious, but roughly 15% of the 800 people exposed were killed by the gas. The situation was not helped by the fact that the authorities kept the nature of the incapacitating agent secret from doctors trying to treat its victims. At the time, the gas was reported to be an unknown incapacitating agent called "Kolokol-1". The Russian Health Minister Yuri Shevchenko later stated that the incapacitating agent used was a fentanyl derivative.

Scientists at Britain's chemical and biological defense labs at Porton Down analyzed residue from the clothing of three hostages and the urine of one hostage rescued during the Moscow theater hostage crisis and found two chemical derivatives of fentanyl, remifentanil and carfentanil.

=== Bolivian rapes ===
In a Mennonite community in Bolivia, eight men were convicted of raping 130 women in Manitoba Colony over a four-year period from 2005 to 2009, by spraying "a chemical used to anesthetize cows" through the victims' open bedroom windows. The perpetrators would then wait for the women to be incapacitated, whereupon they entered the residences to commit the crimes. Later, the women would awaken to a pounding headache, find blood, semen or dirt on their sheets, and would sometimes discover their extremities had also been bound. Most did not remember the attacks, although a few had vague, fleeting memories of men on top of them. Several men and boys were also suspected of having been raped. While additional actors were thought to have participated, they were never identified nor prosecuted; in fact, the rapes did not stop with the incarceration of the original eight men.

When two of these men were caught in the act of entering one of the women's homes, they implicated friends in the rapes to local authorities. Eventually nine Manitoba men, ages 19 to 43, were charged with using a spray adapted from an anesthetic by a veterinarian from a neighboring Mennonite colony to subdue their victims, then raping them. Eight of the accused were found guilty of rape, one escaped from the local jail before the end of the trial, and the veterinarian was found guilty of being an accomplice to the rapes. According to at least three residents of the colony, a local prosecutor, and a local journalist, these "ghost rapes" continue despite imprisonment of the men convicted in the 130 original rapes.

== Rape drugs ==
A date rape drug, also called a predator drug, is any drug that can be used as incapacitating agent to assist in the execution of drug facilitated sexual assault (DFSA). The most common types of DFSA are those in which a victim ingested drugs willingly for recreational purposes, or had them administered surreptitiously: it is the latter type of assault that the term "date rape drug" most often refers to.

"The findings by Du Mont and colleagues support the view that alcohol plays a major role in drug-facilitated sexual assault. Previously, Weir noted that cases of drug-facilitated sexual assault were frequently found to involve alcohol, marijuana or cocaine, and were less likely to involve drugs, such as flunitrazepam (Rohypnol) and gamma-hydroxybutyrate, that are commonly described as being used in this context. Similar findings have been reported by others, including Hall and colleagues, in a recent retrospective study from Northern Ireland".

— Butler B, Welch J (3 March 2009). "Drug-facilitated sexual assault". Canadian Medical Association Journal. 180 (5): 493–4. doi:10.1503/cmaj.090006. PMC 2645469. PMID 19255067.

== "Knockout gas" ==
A fictional form of incapacitating agent, sometimes known as "knockout gas", has been a staple of pulp detective and science fiction novels, movies and television shows. It is presented in various forms, but generally is supposed to be a gas or aerosol that affords a harmless method of rendering characters quickly and temporarily unconscious without physical contact. This is in contrast to chloroform, a liquid anesthetic—itself a common element in genre fiction—that requires a victim to be physically subdued before it can be applied.

A number of notable fictional characters created in the early 20th century, both villains and heroes, were associated with the use of knockout gas: Fu Manchu, Dr. Mabuse, Doc Savage, Batman, and The Avenger. A military knockout gas called the "Gas of Peace" is an important plot device in H. G. Wells's 1936 movie Things to Come. It had become a familiar trope by the 1960s, when it was utilized in the X-Men comics. A famous example recurs in every opening sequence of the British TV series The Prisoner (1967–68).

The U.S. Army psychiatrist James S. Ketchum, who worked for almost a decade on the U.S. military's top secret psychochemical warfare program, relates a story relevant to the concept of a "knockout gas" in his 2006 memoir, Chemical Warfare Secrets Almost Forgotten. In 1970, Ketchum and his boss were visited by CIA agents for a brainstorming session at his Maryland laboratory. The agents wanted to know if an incapacitating agent (his specialty) could be used to intervene in the ongoing hijacking of a Tel Aviv aircraft by Palestinian terrorists without injuring the hostages.

We considered the pros and cons of using incapacitating agents and various other options. As it turned out, we could not imagine a scenario in which any available agent could be pumped into the airliner without the hijackers possibly reacting violently and killing passengers. Ultimately, the standoff was resolved by other means.

Arguably, the use of fentanyl derivatives by Russian authorities in the 2002 Moscow hostage crisis (see above) is a real-life instance of deployment of a "knockout gas". Of course, the criterion that the gas reliably render subjects temporarily and harmlessly unconscious was not fulfilled in this case, as the procedure killed about fifteen percent of those subjected to it.

== See also ==
- Demoralization (warfare)
- Less-lethal weapon
- Psychochemical weapon
- Mickey Finn (drugs)
