= Barayev =

Barayev or Baraev (Russian: Бараев) is a masculine surname, its feminine counterpart is Barayeva or Baraeva. The surname may refer to:

- Arbi Barayev (1974–2001), Chechen warlord
- Movsar Barayev (1979–2002), Chechen warlord, nephew of Arbi
- Zura Barayeva (died 2002), Chechen terrorist, wife of Arbi
