= List of Russian aircraft losses in the Second Chechen War =

The following is an incomplete list of Russian aircraft losses in the Second Chechen War. It includes both helicopters and fixed-wing aircraft.

The general Russian aircraft losses 1999–2007 consisted of about 45 helicopters (23 Mi-8, 16 Mi-24, three Mi-26 and three others) and 8 fixed-wing aircraft (two Su-24 fighter-bombers and six Su-25 ground-attack aircraft).

== 1999 ==
- August 9, 2 Mi-8 helicopters were hit, on the ground at Botlikh airfield, Dagestan, by anti-tank guided missiles, one killed.

In a different accident on the same day a Russian border guard's Mi-8 suffered tail separation on take-off in Dagestan. Three crew members were injured – status unknown.

- August 11, an Mi-8MT shot down by gunfire near the village of Novokuli, killing three.
- September 9, a Su-25 crashed near the village of Buinaksk in Dagestan, due to mechanical malfunction. Pilot ejected and rescued.
- September 11, a Russian military helicopter shot down near the Dagestani village of Duchi while on a reconnaissance mission.
- September 24, an Mi-26 heavy transport helicopter crash-landed and exploded in Dagestan with no reported casualties.
- October 3, a Su-25 was shot down by a missile during a reconnaissance mission over the village of Tolstoy-Yurt killing its pilot.
- October 4, a Su-24 shot down near the Chechen capital Grozny while searching for the Su-25 attack plane crashed the day before; the pilot was killed while the navigator was captured.
- December 13, a Su-25 ground attack plane went down in the morning in the area of Bachi-Yurt. Russian military officials said that the aircraft went down due to one of its S-13 unguided rockets jamming in the launcher and causing serious damage to the plane. The pilot, Sergei Borisyuk, ejected safely and was rescued after 26 hours.
- Later in the same day a Mi-24 and a Mi-8 were destroyed while searching for the Su-25 plane that crashed earlier. The Mi-24 crashed in heavy fog killing two crew members. A Mi-8 was able to locate and pickup the pilot of the Su-25, however two Mi-8s returned to the Mi-24's crash site and were attacked by Chechen rebels near the village of Staryye Atagi, while carrying out a low altitude flight. One of the Mi-8s was shot down and crashed, killing four people on board.

== 2000 ==
- January 12, two Mi-8 pilots, including the Hero of the Soviet Union Nikolay Maidanov, killed in an ambush as they prepared to land at Grozny Khankala airfield; the helicopter crash-landed by the flight technician.
- January 22, one Mi-8 helicopter suffered mechanical malfunction and crash-landed; no casualties. Another Mi-8 suffered mechanical malfunction and crash-landed; several injured.
- January 29, two Russian Mi-8 transport helicopters came under fire over southern Chechnya, killing one man and severely wounding another.
- February 18, a Russian army Mi-8 transport helicopter was shot down in the south of Chechnya, killing 15 people aboard.
- February 21, an Mi-24 assault helicopter was heavily damaged by ground fire near Shatoi and crash-landed; no casualties.
- May 7, a Su-24MR reconnaissance plane crashed into a mountain in dense fog near the village of Benoi-Vedeno during a target-acquisition mission for a flight of several Su-25; the crew of two were killed.
- May 14, an Mi-8 crashed on take-off due to a technical problem; 15 people on board were injured.
- June 12, a Russian army transport helicopter crashed near Grozny, killing the crew of four.
- August 6, an Mi-8 downed by ground fire, killing one airborne soldier.

== 2001 ==
- May 31, an Mi-8 with 15 passengers aboard damaged by ground fire; pilot died from wounds after landing the damaged helicopter.
- June 1, two members of the State Duma's defence committee Alexei Arbatov and Yevgeny Zelenov injured in an attack near the border with Chechnya; the pilot of the helicopter was fatally wounded, and the co-pilot was forced to make an emergency landing.
- June 14, two Russian Air Force Su-25 planes simultaneously crashed into a mountain while on a combat mission, killing both pilots. The two aircraft crashed due to low visibility and difficult terrain.
- June 14, one Mi-8 heavily damaged by ground fire and made emergency landing; crew unharmed.
- July 19, a Russian Interior Ministry helicopter crashes near Engenoi, killing nine special forces troops and wounding five.
- August 4, an Mi-8 transport helicopter crashes near the village of Tuskhoroi in Chechnya, killing three and injuring five.
- August 15, a Mi-25 gunship shot down by an RPG near Tsa Vedeno, killing both pilots.
- August 17, Chechen fighters claim to shoot down a helicopter, a claim denied by Russian officials.
- September 2, Russian military helicopter Mi-8 crashed down near the Chechen village of Khindoy, killing four Russian service men and wounding two.
- September 17, a surface-to-air missile shot down a VIP Mi-8 helicopter over central Grozny killing 13. The explosion killed several high-ranking Army officers, Major-General Anatoli Pozdnyakov (member of the General Staff of the Russian Armed Forces), Major-General Pavel Varfolomeyev (deputy director of staff of the Defence Ministry of Russia), eight colonels, and three crew members.

== 2002 ==
- January 27, a Russian Interior Ministry Mi-8 was shot down in Nadterechny District and exploded, killing 14 people including the crew. Among those killed in the crash were Russian Deputy Interior Minister Lieutenant-General Mikhail Rudchenko (responsible for security in the Southern Federal District), and deputy commander of the Internal Troops Major-General Nikolai Goridov, as well as several other high-ranking officers including Colonels Oriyenko, Stepanenko, and Trafimov.
- February 7, a Russian military helicopter crashed and exploded shortly after take-off from Grozny, killing eight to 10 people aboard.
- April 29, a Russian Su-25 jet fighter crashed over the Vedeno region of southeast Chechnya, killing the pilot.
- August 9, the rebels shot down an Mi-8 military helicopter near the village of Dyshne-Vedeno, killing up to three crew members.
- August 19, an overloaded Mi-26 transport helicopter crashes into a mine field near the main Russian army base of Khankala, killing 127 soldiers aboard after being hit by a rebel missile. As of 2008, is the greatest loss of life in the history of helicopter aviation. A day of mourning was declared in Russia in connection with the catastrophe.
- August 31, Russian forces announced that an Mi-24 was shot down by enemy fire near Nozhai-Yurt, killing both crew members, as the 36th helicopter lost since September 1999.
- October 18, a military helicopter crashed into the Terek river in Chechnya, killing at least one.
- October 29, an Mi-8 helicopter crashed during an attempted landing near Grozny, killing three crew members and an onboard officer.
- September 1, a Russian military Mi-24 helicopter was shot down by a missile near the mountain village of Meskhety, with both crew members killed.
- September 27, an Mi-24 gunship helicopter was shot down over Galashki in Ingushetia during a fierce firefight with rebels, killing two airmen.
- November 3, Chechen rebels shot down an Mi-8, killing nine servicemen. The helicopter was struck by a portable ground-to-air missile fired from a building near Grozny shortly after its take-off from Khankala.

== 2003 ==
- March 20, two Mi-24 went missing during a combat mission in Chechnya.
- July 7, an Mi-8 military helicopter crashed outside the village of Oyskhara, killing four and injuring 11 servicemen.
- August 7, an Mi-8 helicopter came under fire from the ground and crashed in the area of the Dyshne-Vedeno, killing one and seriously injuring two.

== 2004 ==
- September 5, an Mi-8 belonging to the MVD was found crashed into a mountain near the Ingush village of Karabulak, killing two and injuring one.
- September 14, Chechen rebels shot down an Mi-24 helicopter, both crew members survived and landed safely.

== 2005 ==
- March 10, a Russian Mi-8 helicopter crashes en route to Khankala, after hitting a power line (bullet holes were later reportedly found in the wreckage.). The crash killed 15 of the 16 people aboard, including members of the spetsnaz commando unit, Khabarovsk FSB, and the crew,
- March 22, a Russian Mi-8 military helicopter crashed near Khankala, with some reports saying six people on board were killed.
- July 16, a Russian border guard Mi-8 helicopter crashed in the Chechen mountains, resulting in eight dead, with one survivor.

== 2006 ==
- September 11, three army generals, including chief of logistics of Russia's North Caucasus Military District, Major-General Vladimir Sorokin, died when an army Mi-8 crashed in a suburb of Vladikavkaz, killing at least 12. A North Ossetian Islamic rebel group claimed they shot down the helicopter, but the defence ministry say the aircraft struck a tree in thick fog.

== 2007 ==
- April 27, a Russian military Mi-8 helicopter was downed by automatic rifle fire in Chechnya, killing all 20 people aboard.

== See also ==
- 2001 Grozny Mi-8 crash
- 2002 Khankala Mi-26 crash
- 2002 Shelkovskaya Mi-8 crash
- 2007 Shatoy Mi-8 crash
