= Alkhan-Kala operation =

2001 Russian military operation in Chechnya

Coordinates: 43.259°N 45.535°E

- Part of Second Chechen War
Date	22 June 2001 – 28 June 2001
Location	Alkhan-Kala, Chechnya
Result	Russian victory

Belligerents
Russia	(Chechnya) Chechen Republic of Ichkeria

Commanders and leaders
	(Chechen Republic of Ichkeria) Arbi Barayev †

Casualties and losses
1+	18+ separatists killed
- Unknown civilians killed or wounded 800 civilians arrested

The Alkhan-Kala operation was a zachistka (Russian: зачистка) operation by Russian forces in Alkhan-Kala, Chechnya, starting on 25 June 2001, during the Second Chechen War. The week-long sweep of Alkhan-Kala erupted into armed clashes with Chechen separatists, and the initial raid resulted in the death of Arbi Barayev, a high-ranking Chechen insurgent commander and organized crime leader.

== Background ==
The Chechen Republic of Ichkeria (Chechnya) had been de facto independent from Russia since the beginning of the First Chechen War in 1994. During this independence the secular government weakened, and Chechnya came under the increasing influence of warlords and Islamist rule. In August 1999, the War of Dagestan began when Chechen Islamists invaded the Russian state of Dagestan, but were defeated by the Russian military in a month. The War of Dagestan was used as a casus belli to trigger the Second Chechen War, when Russian federal troops entered Chechnya and ended its independence. By June 2000, the war had entered an "insurgency phase", where Russian troops would perform several day-long zachistka (Russian: зачистка) operations in Chechen villages.

== Operation ==
On 22 June 2001, Russian troops launched a zachistka on Alkhan-Kala, a large village south-west of Grozny, triggering an armed clash with Chechen separatists. Alkhan-Kala was the home village of Arbi Barayev, one of the most powerful separatist warlords in Chechnya and founder of the Special Purpose Islamic Regiment, an Islamist organized crime syndicate that had terrorized Chechnya during its de facto independence after the First Chechen War. Officially, Barayev was reported killed in action in the initial raid, and his body was later handed over to his family. Barayev's death had previously been reported by Russian media several times, only to re-emerge unscathed every time, however, after the raid the Kavkaz Center announced that "Special Islamic commander Arbi Barayev has become a martyr."

The battle between Russian forces and Chechen separatists continued for six days and resulted in the massive destruction of Alkhan-Kala, with house-to-house fighting leaving dozens of homes destroyed. According to the Russian officials, many of Barayev's accomplices were killed and some 800 villagers were taken into the custody.

== Aftermath ==
Arbi Barayev had been the most senior separatist leader to have been killed or captured by the Russians since the Second Chechen War began in 1999, and was hailed by Moscow as a major success in winning the war. According to alternative version of Barayev's death, he was captured alive and handed over to the FSB, the main Russian national security agency, but was wanted by members of GRU, the Russian foreign military intelligence agency, for possible involvement in the suspicious death of German Ugryumov. Allegedly, GRU enlisted Chechen fighters involved in a blood feud with Barayev to raid the FSB compound where he was kept in custody, abduct him and hand him over to GRU at the Khankala military base, where he was subsequently tortured to death.
