= 1998 abduction of foreign engineers in Chechnya =

Abductions and murders in Chechnya

- Location: Grozny, Ichkeria
- Date: 1998

In 1998, four United Kingdom-based telecommunications engineers were abducted by unidentified Chechen gunmen in Grozny, the capital of the unrecognized secessionist Chechen Republic of Ichkeria (ChRI). After more than two months in captivity, the four were murdered by their captors, reportedly following a failed rescue bid. As of 2026, no one has been tried in this case.

The victims were three Britons: Peter Kennedy (46), of Hereford, Darren Hickey (26), from Surrey, Rudi Petschi (42), of Devon, and New Zealand-born Stan Shaw (58). The four men had been working for Granger Telecom, a British telecommunication company which had won a £183m contract for the separatist government-run company Chechentelekom to install telephone lines, satellite links and a mobile phone system throughout the war-ravaged republic; the work was suspended after the four men were kidnapped.

The killings were a major blow to the efforts of the breakaway republic to gain international recognition of its declaration of independence. Kidnappings had become common in Chechnya, procuring over $200 million during the three year independence, particularly since the end of the First Chechen War in 1996, as the ruined region's fledgling separatist government failed to maintain law and order, with some of the kidnapped people being sold into indentured servitude to Chechen families, where they were regarded as slaves and had to endure starvation, beating, and often maiming. Since the industries of hostage-taking and slavery flourished in the inter-war years, most foreign nationals left the region by early 1998. Prior to the murder of the engineers of Granger Telecom, six foreign International Committee of the Red Cross (ICRC) delegates were assassinated on 17 December 1996. A seventh delegate, also a foreigner, was wounded and left for dead.

== Kidnapping ==
On the night of October 3, 1998, a well-armed group of up to 20 Chechen-speaking men captured four foreign workers from their home in Grozny, located in the vicinity of the headquarters of the Chechen security team specifically tasked with fighting the plague of kidnappings in the republic. The attackers fought a brief gun battle with one of the victims' lightly armed local bodyguards (according to Chechen officials the other five bodyguards did not open fire) and one member of the gang was reportedly wounded. Nevertheless, the anti-kidnapping unit's officers did not react to the shooting, allegedly because they were not aware of the presence of the foreigners at the house, and the sound of gunfire was frequent in Grozny at night.

All the law enforcement agencies of the ChRI got involved in the search for the victims. More than 60 other hostages were released as Chechen officials launched raids on the homes of suspected kidnappers, but the missing engineers were not found. During the crackdown, several suspects in the abduction were arrested, but all were later released for lack of evidence. On October 8, a spokesman for Chechnya's Security Ministry said the abductees were alive and well, but the kidnappers had not set demands or conditions for their release.

After nearly two months, at the end of November, the kidnappers contacted Granger, promising that the hostages were alive and well and demanding a ransom of 10 million dollars. The British Foreign and Commonwealth Office had already announced that it was Her Majesty's Government's policy not to pay ransoms, but Granger agreed to find the money. According to the 2005 article in Kommersant, the management of state-owned telecommunications company Chechentelekom determined that the engineers were in the hands of the rogue Chechen commander and reputed organized crime figure Arbi Barayev; during the war with Russia, Barayev abducted a group of 29 Russian engineers near Grozny and later exchanged them for a large sum of money. According to the rumors, the company even took one of Barayev's deputies hostage and proposed exchanging him for the foreigners, yet Barayev declined and continued in demanding $10m for their release.

== Murder ==
On December 8, the abductees' heads were found in a sack on the side of a highway in the Chechen village of Assinovskaya, close to the border with the Russian republic of Ingushetia, and were soon identified by one of the victims' bodyguards. In a press conference on December 10, Chechnya's vice-president, Vakha Arsanov, showed a recovered video tape in which the kidnappers forced the four to dress in military uniforms and confess in Russian to spying for "German, English and Israeli special services" and the CIA. According to Chechen security forces, the hostages were executed at an unused factory south of Grozny after a rescue operation that went wrong; it was suggested that their death was a show of defiance to the authorities from the kidnappers. Family members said the abortive rescue attempt "ruined delicate negotiations" that were going on between Granger and the kidnappers, and also criticized an unnamed news agency that had given out details of where the hostages were being held shortly before the operation.

On December 29, the Chechen officials found the four victims' headless corpses on the outskirts of Grozny, reportedly after paying $2,000 a piece for the return of the bodies. That same day, the remains of the engineers were transported by Chechen Deputy Prime Minister Turpal-Ali Atgeriyev to Russian republic of Dagestan and flown through Azerbaijan to Gatwick Airport near London. According to the inquest by the Westminster Coroner's Court, the kidnapped men were starved of food and water, and had been repeatedly struck with rifle butts before being decapitated with a large knife. Examination of the bodies showed all the men had been extremely malnourished and Rudi Petschi had suffered particularly severe injuries.

== Reactions ==
- United Nations Secretary-General Kofi Annan said he was "shocked" by the murder.
- According to his spokesman, President of Russia Boris Yeltsin was "deeply disturbed".
- President of Ichkeria Aslan Maskhadov said he was "saddened and angered". He also announced a national crackdown on kidnappers and called for mobilisation of war veterans to fight the organized crime.
- The British Foreign Secretary, Robin Cook, described the murders as "repugnant" and pledged to discover exactly what led to the tragedy. Paul Keetch, the MP for the constituency where victim Peter Kennedy lived, has blamed the Chechen security forces for bungling a rescue attempt.

== Suspects ==
At the time of the abduction many of the region's warlords were in open revolt against the ChRI government of Maskhadov, and several analysts interpreted the abductions as a political act. Maskhadov himself blamed the atrocity on the "foreign special services" and their Chechen henchmen, hinting at a possible involvement of Russian special services using Chechen "bandits" to destabilise the breakaway territory. A similar opinion was voiced later by the Chechen commander Ruslan Gelayev, who in an interview for the BBC said that the act was provocation organized by "men trained by the Russian special services" as a part of an alleged plot to turn the public opinion of neighboring nations and the world against Chechnya. The British investigation at the time surmised that the four were the victims of "warring mercenary factions".

=== Arbi Barayev ===
On December 13, 1998, Maskhadov officially named the warlord Arbi Barayev as the chief suspect. Barayev himself denied that his group kidnapped and killed the foreigners. Some former hostages, including Magomed Chaguchiev from Dagestan, said they were held by Barayev together with the victims. Abdurakhman Adukhov, a former Russian hostage, claimed in November 2001 that Barayev told him that Osama bin Laden paid him $30m to kill the hostages, outbidding the ransom demand of $10m. Aid worker and writer Jonathan Littell paid attention to sources claiming "that two of the murdered engineers were in fact undercover British agents" and, citing "a young Chechen journalist", speculated that it was probably the Federal Security Service of the Russian Federation (FSB) that outbid the employers of kidnapped workers to get them beheaded by Barayev and his gang, rather than be released. In his opinion, "the video and photographic material conveniently generated by Baraev and his partners went straight to feed the FSB's propaganda efforts at the start of the second war".

Barayev was reported killed by either Russian or pro-Russian forces during the Second Chechen War in June 2001; according to the reports from the republic, prior to this moment he has been semi-openly collaborating with the federal forces and living freely in Chechnya under protection of the FSB. In August 2002, Russian military officials announced the arrest of a man named Khusein Idiyev, described by them as a prominent member of Barayev's group, suspected of involvement in the 1998 killings. In December 2004, members of the Chechen OMON special police summarily executed Isa Sakayev, allegedly a former associate of Barayev suspected to have been directly involved in the killings. In April 2005, Russian security forces said they had captured Adam Dzhabrailov, a Chechen man who they said has confessed to have participated in the atrocity (according to the Russian military spokesman, Dzhabrailov was also suspected of involvement in the 1996 killings at the ICRC Hospital of Novye Atagi and in the 2002 Moscow theater hostage crisis); in remarks broadcast on Russian TV, Dzhabrailov said that "Arbi [Barayev] shot them dead" (however, according to the British inquest, the victims were not shot).

=== Other suspects ===
In December 1998, ChRI authorities announced that a suspect, identified by the Itar-Tass as Apti Abitayev (Abitaev), was arrested over the abductions and had confessed to kidnapping the four foreigners. He was also named by the Chechen separatist warlord Shamil Basayev in a 2005 interview to Channel 4 News; according to Basayev, Ruslan Dzhamalkhan from Urus-Martan was involved in the crime together with Abitayev, and later became a district chief in the pro-Moscow Chechen police forces. Abitayev, described by the ex-FSB defector Alexander Litvinenko as a kidnapper connected to Russian special services, was reportedly killed by Russians in May 2001. In January 2008, Chechenpress, website of the ChRI government-in-exile (by then led by Akhmed Zakayev), claimed that the unspecified witnesses' testimony indicate that the Chechen Islamist ideologist (and Zakayev's political rival) Movladi Udugov planned those killings, and that members of the armed group subordinate to Abitayev carried them out.

According to an article in Novaya Gazeta, the hostages were kidnapped and killed by the group led by the brothers Uvais and Ramzan Akhmadov. In March 2001, Russia announced capture of Ruslan Akhmadov, who a Kremlin spokesman said was a member of the gang suspected of executing the foreigners.

== Lawsuits ==
In June 2003, the families of three hostages sued Granger Telecom for more than £1m.

== See also ==
- List of kidnappings (1990–1999)
- List of solved missing person cases (1990s)
- List of unsolved murders (1980–1999)
