= Special Purpose Islamic Regiment =

1996–2006 Chechen Islamist organization

- Исламский полк особого назначения
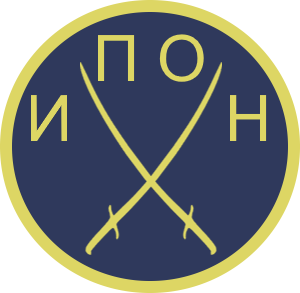
- Patch worn by members of the SPIR (ИПОН)
- Leaders: Arbi Barayev †; Movsar Barayev †
- Dates active: 1996–2006
- Headquarters: Grozny, Chechnya
- Active regions: Chechnya; Dagestan
- Ideology: Salafism; Islamic fundamentalism North Caucasian separatism
- Size: 1000 (1998); 100 (2004)
- Part of: Chechen Republic of Ichkeria
- Wars: the Chechen–Russian conflict

The Special Purpose Islamic Regiment (Russian: Исламский полк особого назначения; abbreviated SPIR), also known as the al-Jihad-Fi-Sabililah Special Islamic Regiment, was a Chechen organization loosely formed by Chechen warlord Arbi Barayev in 1996. It was regarded as one of the main hostage-taking, kidnapping, and oil-smuggling groups operating in Chechnya during the lawless interwar period that followed the First Chechen War (1994–1996) with Russia. It is most notorious for its role in the October 2002 Moscow theater hostage crisis, when the group took some 800 hostages in the Russian capital; by then, SPIR was headed by Movsar Barayev—the nephew of Arbi (killed in 2001)—and likely never had more than 100 fighters at any given time. UN Security Council sanction documents alleged ties and assistance from al-Qaeda, Taliban and Osama bin Laden.

During the Moscow theatre hostage crisis, Movsar Barayev and some 40 men and women led by him (dubbed the 29th Suicide Division) that also included members of two other Chechen rebel groups, brought together by Shamil Basayev, were killed in a raid by Russian special forces units Alfa and Vympel after having been incapacitated by the chemical attack that also killed at least 129 of their hostages. The SPIR fighters under Yunadi Turchayev, who became a deputy of Dokka Umarov, also took part in the large-scale raid on central Grozny in 2004, in which more than 100 combatants and civilians were killed.

In 2004, the United States Department of State included "The Special Purpose Islamic Regiment (a.k.a. the Islamic Special Purpose Regiment, a.k.a. the al-Jihad-Fisi-Sabililah Special Islamic Regiment, a.k.a. Islamic Regiment of Special Meaning)" on the Terrorist Exclusion List under the USA PATRIOT Act.

As of 2006 (when the SPIR has had at least seven commanders since it was founded), it reportedly continued to conduct limited guerrilla operations in Chechnya under the leadership of the man known only as Amir Aslan, followed by Amirs Rashid and Abdul-Malik. On 4 June 2008, Alkavkaz website reported that Abdul-Malik and three of his comrades had been killed during a skirmish in a forest near Grozny.
