= Moscow hostage crisis chemical agent =

The gaseous chemical agent used to end the Moscow theatre hostage crisis of 2002, causing the deaths of all 40 hostage-takers and 132 of the 912 hostages of many nationalities, has never been identified by Russian authorities, nor has it been conclusively identified by independent science.

== Suspected agents ==
At the time, the agent was surmised to be some sort of surgical anesthetic or chemical weapon. Afterwards, based on statements made by Russian authorities publicly and through diplomatic channels, more specific chemicals were suspected, such as:

- the tranquilizer diazepam,
- the anticholinergic 3-Quinuclidinyl benzilate,
- the oripavine-derived Bentley-series opioid etorphine,
- fentanyl,
- 3-methylfentanil,
- another synthetic opioid analogous or derivative to the above,
- a morphine derivative,
- an ordinary anaesthetic gas,
- and/or the anaesthetic halothane.

== Formal statements ==
Foreign embassies in Moscow issued official requests for more information on the gas to aid in treatment of their affected citizens, but were publicly ignored. While still refusing to identify the gas, on 28 October 2002 (two days after its use ended the crisis), the Russian government informed the U.S. Embassy of some of the gas' effects. The Russian media reported the drug was Kolokol-1, either mefentanyl or α-methylfentanil dissolved in a halothane base. In the records of the official investigation of the act, the agent is referred to as a certain "gaseous substance", in other cases it is referred to as an "unidentified chemical substance".

Four days after the incident, on 30 October 2002, Russia responded to increasing domestic and international pressure with a statement on the unknown gas by Health Minister Yuri Shevchenko. He said that the gas was a fentanyl derivative, an extremely powerful opioid. Boris Grebenyuk, the All-Russia Disaster Relief Service chief, said the services used trimethyl phentanylum (3-methylfentanyl, a fentanyl analog that is about 1000 times more potent than morphine, which was manufactured and abused in the former Soviet Union). The Russian language newspaper Gazeta.ru claimed that the chemical used had been 3-methylfentanyl, attributing this information to "experts from the Moscow State University chemistry department."

== Investigation outside of Russia ==
Clothing samples from British survivors of the attack showed the presence of the narcotics remifentanil and carfentanil. The same study detected norcarfentanil in another survivor's urine. Thomas Zilker, a German toxicology professor who examined several German hostages, said that their blood and urine contained halothane, a once-common inhalation anaesthetic which is now seldom used in Western countries, and that it was likely the gas had additional components.. Later publications in medical journals assumed that Russian special forces used aerosol of a fentanyl derivative, such as carfentanil, and an inhalational anesthetic, such as halothane "

== Skepticism ==
3-methylfentanyl is not a gas, according to New Scientist.

Halothane has a strong odor (although often described as "pleasant" by comparison with other anesthetic gases). Thus, by the time the whole theatre area would be filled with halothane to a concentration compatible with loss of consciousness (0.5–3%), it is likely that the hostage-takers would have realized they were being attacked.

Recovery of consciousness is rapid after the flow of gas is interrupted, unlike with high-dose fentanyl administration. Therefore, although halothane might have been a component in the aerosol, it was probably not a major component, or perhaps it was a metabolite of another drug.

== Other theories ==
=== Newspapers ===
Writing in the Moscow daily Komsomolskaya Pravda, Viktor Baranets, a former Russian Defense Ministry official, stated that the Ministry of the Interior knew that any normal riot control agent, such as pepper spray or tear gas, would allow the attackers time to harm the hostages. They decided to use the strongest agent available. The paper identified the material as a KGB-developed "psycho-chemical gas" known as Kolokol-1, and reported that "the gas had such an influence on siege leader Barayev that he couldn't get up from [his] desk". Russian doctors who helped hostages in the first minutes after the siege used a common antidote to fentanyl, naloxone, by injection. But the effects of the fentanyl derivative's application, which can exacerbate chronic diseases, grew acute for the hostages, who had stayed in a closed space without water and food for several days.

=== Zilker and Wheelis ===
Thomas Zilker and Mark Wheelis, interviewed for the BBC's Horizon documentary series, dispute that the gas could have been based on fentanyl.

Thomas Zilker: It seems to be different from fentanyl, carfentanil and sufentanil, but it has to be, it has to have the potency of carfentanil at least because otherwise it wouldn’t work in this circumstance. So the Russians obviously have designed a new fentanyl which we cannot detect in the west.

Mark Wheelis: The fact that the Russians did it and got away with a lethality of less than twenty percent suggests to me that very likely there may have been a novel agent with a higher safety margin than normal fentanyl.

=== Riches et al. ===
In 2012, Riches et al. found evidence from liquid chromatography-tandem mass spectrometry analysis of extracts of clothing from two British survivors, and urine from a third survivor, that the aerosol was a mixture carfentanil and remifentanil the exact proportions of which they could not determine. Assuming that these were the only active constituents (which has not been verified by the Russian military), the primary acute toxic effect to the theatre victims would have been opioid-induced apnea; in this case mechanical ventilation and/or treatment with naloxone, the specific antidote for poisoning with carfentanil in humans, would have been life-saving for many or all victims. If fentanyl or a fentanyl derivative was used, the hostage liberators had only minutes to inject naloxone into the hostages before death by asphyxiation occurred.
