= United Nations Security Council Resolution 1440 =

UN Security Council Resolution 1440
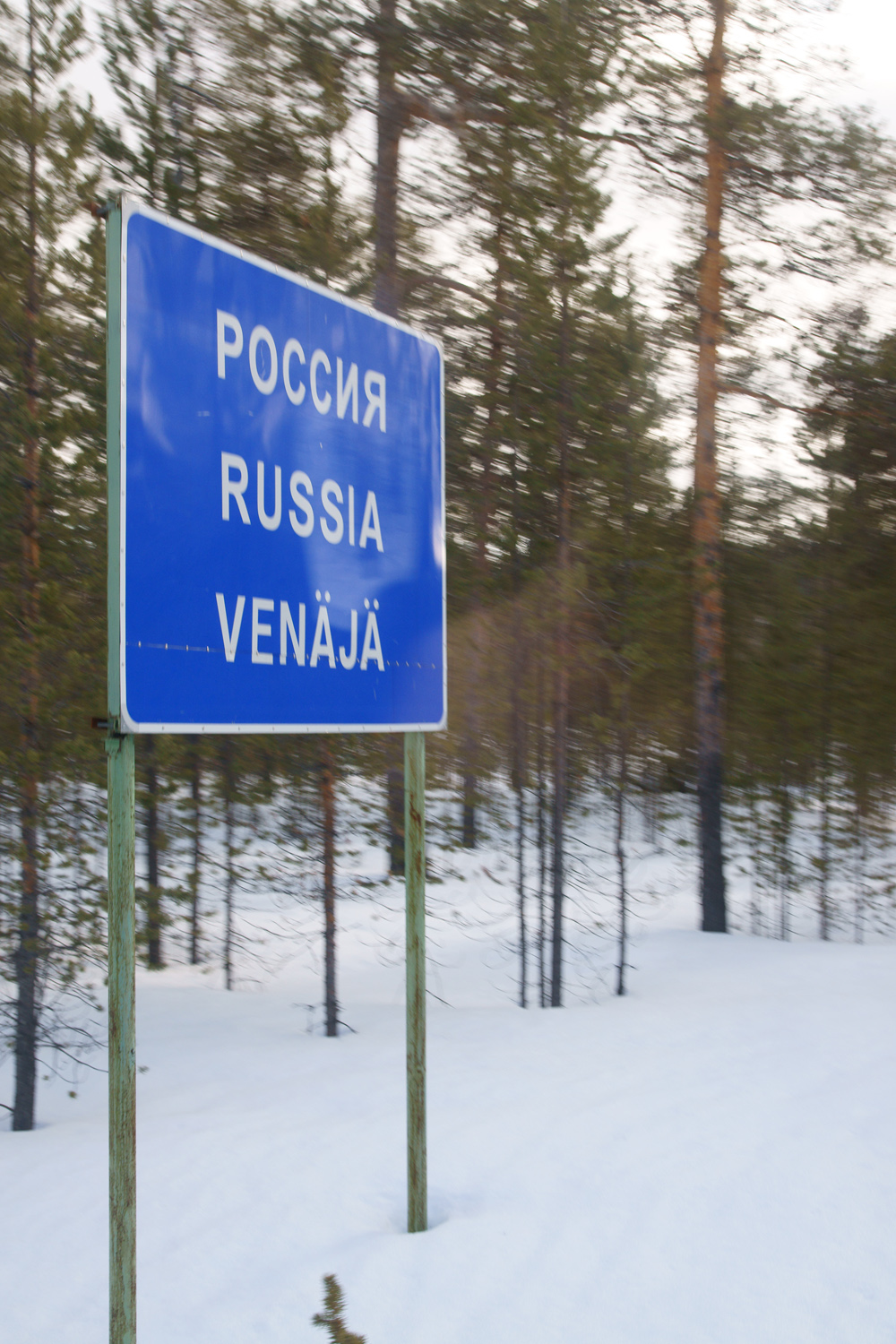
- International border sign between Russia and Finland
- Date: 24 October 2002
- Meeting no.: 4,632
- Code: S/RES/1440 (Document)
- Subject: Threats to international peace and security caused by terrorist acts
- Voting summary: 15 voted for; None voted against; None abstained
- Result: Adopted

Security Council composition
- Permanent members: China; France; Russia; United Kingdom; United States
- Non-permanent members: Bulgaria; Cameroon; Colombia; Guinea; Ireland; Mauritius; Mexico; Norway; Singapore; Syria

United Nations Security Council resolution 1440, adopted unanimously on 24 October 2002, after reaffirming the principles of the United Nations Charter and Resolution 1373 (2001), the Council condemned the hostage-taking at a theatre in Moscow, Russia, by Chechen militants.

The Security Council reaffirmed the need to combat threats to international peace and security caused by terrorist acts. It condemned taking of hostages in a Moscow theatre, as well as terrorist acts carried out in other countries, and demanded their immediate release. The Council expressed sympathy and condolences to the families of the victims and the Russian government and people.

The resolution called upon all states to co-operate with and provide assistance to the Russian authorities to bring the perpetrators to justice in accordance with their obligations under Resolution 1373. Finally, the Council concluded by expressing its determination to combat all forms of terrorism.

== See also ==
- Chechen Republic of Ichkeria
- List of United Nations Security Council Resolutions 1401 to 1500 (2002–2003)
- Moscow theater hostage crisis
