= Tsotsin-Yurt operation =

2001–2002 Russian military operation in Chechnya

- Part of the Second Chechen War
Date	December 30, 2001 – January 3, 2002
Location	Tsotsin-Yurt, Chechnya
Result	Inconclusive, military stalemate

Belligerents
Russia	Chechen Republic of Ichkeria

Units involved
Spetsnaz	

Casualties and losses
2+ killed 11 wounded	3+ killed 11+ disappeared
- 16 civilians killed or missing, numerous injured

The Tsotsin-Yurt operation was a zachistka-type (Russian: зачистка) operation by Russian Spetsnaz forces in Tsotsin-Yurt, Chechnya, from December 30, 2001 to January 3, 2002, during the Second Chechen War. The four-day sweep of Tsotsin-Yurt erupted into armed clashes with Chechen separatists, ending in a stalemate with disputed casualty figures. Russian forces were accused of widespread human rights violations, including pillaging, ethnic cleansing and forced disappearances.

== Background ==
The Chechen Republic of Ichkeria (Chechnya) had been de facto independent from Russia since the beginning of the First Chechen War in 1994. During this independence the secular government weakened, and Chechnya came under the increasing influence of warlords and Islamist rule. In August 1999, the War of Dagestan began when Chechen Islamists invaded the Russian state of Dagestan, but were defeated by the Russian military in a month. The War of Dagestan was used as a casus belli to trigger the Second Chechen War, when Russian federal troops entered Chechnya and ended its independence. By June 2000, the war had entered an "insurgency phase", where Russian troops would perform several day-long zachistka (Russian: зачистка) operations that became notorious for their human rights violations.

== Operation ==
The operation by the Russian Spetsnaz special forces in Tsostin-Yurt, a large village near Argun south-east of the Chechen capital of Grozny, started on December 30, 2001. Reportedly, an armed conflict broke out and resulted in a disputed number of deaths among combatants and civilians, as well as 11 forced disappearances. The Russian casualties included at least two commandos killed and 11 wounded. Three Chechen rebel fighters who were surrounded in a house were also confirmed killed.

The Russian government sources, however, presented the incident as a fierce battle in which 21 to 43 rebel fighters were killed, according to the differing figures by Russian officials.

== Aftermath ==
=== Abuses ===
According to the Russian human rights group Memorial, the operation was accompanied by gross and massive violations of human rights and of Russian law. Accusations included pillage and wanton destruction of civilian property, desecration of a mosque, massive robberies and extortion, and beatings and torture of around 100 detainees in the "filtration point", of which 11 were forcibly disappeared and five were found to be brutally murdered. There was also reported use of human shields by the Russian forces. Foreign media sources reported the murders of 37, or even 80, civilians during the course of the operation, but this was not confirmed by the Memorial. According to the April 2002 Amnesty International report, "The fate and whereabouts of the 11 people named in the original urgent action, who were detained by Russian security forces during the December 2001-January 2002 raid on Tsotsin-Yurt, is unknown."

According to a March 2002 open letter, during the war 41 residents of Tsotsin-Yurt died or disappeared during so-called mopping-up operations, more than 20 died of wounds inflicted by gunfire or bombings, five were killed at checkpoints, six were tortured to death, and 12 were picked up for questioning in their homes, some as long as two years before, and had yet to return.

=== Other zachistka operations in Tsotsin-Yurt ===
A zachistka operation had occurred in Tsotsin-Yurt two months earlier in October to November 2001, where Russian troops were accused of abuses again residents. Another zachistka then occurred in the village a month after in February 2002, following an attack on a Russian military vehicle, which also resulting in a various human rights violations, including civilian killings, property destruction and looting.
