= Zura Barayeva =

Chechen "black widow" suicide bomber

Zura Barayeva (died 26 October 2002) was the widow of Arbi Barayev, a notorious Chechen warlord. She was killed during the Moscow theater hostage crisis in October 2002, in which she headed a female unit.

A former hostage described her:

"She seemed very normal. She hid her feelings behind a mask of courtesy. She seemed to take pleasure that she was in this situation, that people were listening to her and wanting to talk to her, that she was in control. She would ask people if they had children. She would always say, "Everything will be fine. It will finish peacefully". She took off her bomb belt and carried it over her shoulder, all very relaxed."

== See also ==
- Shahidka
