= Movsar Barayev =

Chechen Islamist militia leader (1979–2002)

- Мовсар Бухарович Бараев
- Born: 26 October 1979; Argun, Checheno–Ingush ASSR, Russian SFSR, Soviet Union
- Died: 26 October 2002 (aged 23); Moscow, Russia
- Other name: Movsar Suleimanov
- Known for: Moscow hostage crisis

Movsar Buharovich Barayev (Russian: Мовсар Бухарович Бараев; 26 October 1979 – 26 October 2002), earlier known as Suleimanov, was a Chechen Islamist militia leader during the Second Chechen War, who led the seizure of a Moscow theater that led to the deaths of over 170 people.

== Life ==
Movsar Barayev, born 1979, was the nephew of the Chechen warlord Arbi Barayev who allegedly worked under FSB guidance. After his uncle's death in June 2001 until his own, Movsar was the leader of a Chechen militant group known as the Special Purpose Islamic Regiment (SPIR). Mosvar Barayev was said to be a "sworn enemy" of the Chechen leader and elected president, Aslan Maskhadov. He used the nom-de-guerre of "Yassir".

He was incorrectly reported by the command of the Russian forces in Chechnya to have been killed on 21 August 2001, and again on 12 October 2002, eleven days prior to the Moscow theater crisis (this report of Barayev's death came from Colonel Boris Podoprigora, deputy commander of Russia's Joint Group Forces). It was also claimed that two months before the hostage-taking, the Russian GRU military intelligence had arrested Barayev and contained him "until his release had provided leads to the hostage taking at the Dubrovka theatre".

== Death ==
On 23 October 2002, Barayev and a man known as "Abu Bakar" led a group of forty SPIR militants and their family members (who had dubbed themselves "the suicide squad from the 29th Division") to seize the theater in the Russian capital Moscow, demanding negotiations with Russian authorities for an end to the second war in Chechnya, withdrawal of Russian forces and Chechen independence, threatening to execute his hostages.

Movsar Barayev was killed on the third day of the siege, his 23rd birthday, when the Russian FSB special forces stormed the theater. Barayev's bloodied corpse was shown by the Russian TV lying on the ground of the theater amid broken glass with an intact bottle of cognac near his hand. Later, Russian authorities stated that his body had been buried in an undisclosed location.
