= Moscow theater hostage crisis =

2002 terrorist attack and hostage crisis in Moscow

- Part of the Second Chechen War, Terrorism in Russia and Islamic terrorism in Europe
- Russian special forces storm the Dubrovka Theater during the 2002 Moscow hostage crisis.
Date	23–26 October 2002 (4 days)
Location	Moscow, Russia 55°43′32.5″N 37°40′24.5″E
Result	Crisis ended: Numerous civilian casualties caused by narcotic gas pumped in by Russian security forces; Russian public support for Vladimir Putin and the Second Chechen War surged.

Belligerents
Russia: Spetsnaz GRU; SOBR; FSB	Riyad-us Saliheen Brigade of Martyrs

Commanders and leaders
Vladimir Putin	Movsar Barayev † (leader); Abu Bakar † (deputy leader); Shamil Basayev (claimed responsibility)

Strength
Unknown number of Militsiya personnel, MVD Internal Troops, and spetsnaz operators from a variety of agencies	40–50 militants

Casualties and losses
2 injured	40 killed
- 132 hostages killed, over 700 injured

The Moscow theater hostage crisis, also known as the 2002 Nord-Ost siege, was the seizure of the crowded Dubrovka Theater in Moscow by Chechen terrorists on 23 October 2002, resulting in the taking of 912 hostages. The attackers, led by Movsar Barayev, claimed allegiance to the rebel breakaway movement in Chechnya. They demanded the withdrawal of Russian forces from Chechnya and an end to the Second Chechen War. The crisis ended when Russian security services released sleeping gas into the building, and subsequently stormed it, killing all 40 hostage takers. 132 hostages died, largely due to the effects of the gas.

Due to the layout of the theater, special forces would have had to fight through 30 metres (100 ft) of corridor and advance up a well-defended staircase before they could reach the hall in which the hostages were held. The attackers had numerous explosives, with the most powerful in the center of the auditorium. Spetsnaz operators from Federal Security Service (FSB) Alpha and Vympel, supported by a Russian Ministry of Internal Affairs (MVD) SOBR unit, pumped a chemical agent into the building's ventilation system and began the rescue operation.

The identity of the gas was not disclosed at the time, although it was believed to have been a fentanyl derivative. A study published in 2012 concluded that it had been a mixture of carfentanil and remifentanil. The same study pointed out that in a 2011 case at the European Court of Human Rights, the Russian government stated that the aerosol used was a mixture of a fentanyl derivative and a chemical compound with a narcotic action.

== Initial siege ==
The hostages were seized on 23 October at the House of Culture of State Ball-Bearing Plant Number 1 in the Dubrovka area of Moscow about four kilometers south-east of the Moscow Kremlin. During Act II of a sold-out performance of Nord-Ost a little after 9:00 PM, 40–50 heavily armed masked men and women drove in a bus to the theater and entered the main hall firing assault rifles in the air.

The black-and-camouflage-clad attackers took approximately 850–900 people hostage, including members of the audience and performers, among them an MVD general. The reaction of spectators inside the theater to the news that the theater was under terrorist attack was not uniform: some people remained calm, some reacted hysterically, and others fainted. Some performers who had been resting backstage escaped through an open window and called the police; in all, some 90 people managed to flee the building or hide.

The terrorist leader told the hostages that the attackers (who identified themselves as a suicide squad from "the 29th Division") had no grudge against foreign nationals (about 75 in number from 14 countries, including Australia, Georgia, Germany, the Netherlands, Ukraine, the United Kingdom and the United States) and promised to release anyone who showed a foreign passport.

=== Demands ===
The gunmen were led by Movsar Barayev, nephew of slain Chechen rebel militia commander Arbi Barayev, and threatened to kill the hostages unless Russian forces were immediately and unconditionally withdrawn from Chechnya. They said the deadline was one week, after which they would start killing the hostages.

A videotaped statement was acquired by the media in which the gunmen declared their willingness to die for their cause. The statement contained the following text:

Every nation has the right to their fate. Russia has taken away this right from the Chechens and today we want to reclaim these rights, which God has given us, in the same way he has given it to other nations. God has given us the right of freedom and the right to choose our destiny. And the Russian occupiers have flooded our land with our children's blood. And we have longed for a just solution. People are unaware of the innocent who are dying in Chechnya: the sheikhs, the women, the children and the weak ones. And therefore, we have chosen this approach. This approach is for the freedom of the Chechen people and there is no difference in where we die, and therefore we have decided to die here, in Moscow. And we will take with us the lives of hundreds of sinners. If we die, others will come and follow us—our brothers and sisters who are willing to sacrifice their lives, in God's way, to liberate their nation. Our nationalists have died but people have said that they, the nationalists, are terrorists and criminals. But the truth is Russia is the true criminal.

According to the Kremlin's aide Sergei Yastrzhembsky, "When they were told that the withdrawal of troops was unrealistic within the short period, that it was a very long process, the terrorists put forward the demand to withdraw Russian troops from anywhere in the Republic of Chechnya without specifying which area it was." The hostage-takers demanded termination of the use of artillery and air forces in Chechnya starting the next day (Russian forces ceased using heavy weapons until 28 September), a halt to the notorious zachistka ("mopping-up") operations, and that President of Russia Vladimir Putin should publicly declare that he was striving to stop the war in Chechnya. By the time of the hostage-taking, the conflict in the embattled republic was killing an average of three federal troops daily.

Cell phone conversations between the hostages trapped in the building and their family members revealed that the hostage-takers had grenades, mines and improvised explosive devices strapped to their bodies, and had deployed more explosives throughout the theater. The militants used Arabic names among themselves, and the female terrorists wore Arab-style niqab clothes which are highly unusual in the North Caucasus region.

Mufti Akhmad-Khadzhi Shamayev, official leader of Chechnya's Muslims, said he had no information about who the attackers were and condemned attacks on civilians. The pro-Moscow Islamic leader of Chechnya also condemned the attack.

All hostages were kept in the auditorium and the orchestra pit was used as a lavatory. The situation in the hall was nervous and it frequently changed depending on the mood of the hostage-takers, who were following reports in the mass media. Any kind of misinformation caused hopelessness among the hostages and new aggression among their captors, who would threaten to shoot hostages and blow up the building, but no major incidents took place during the siege. The gunmen let members of the audience make phone calls. One hostage used her mobile phone to plead with authorities not to storm the auditorium, as truckloads of police and soldiers with armored vehicles surrounded the building.

== Hostage-taking ==
=== Day one – 23 October ===
The attackers released 150 to 200 people, including children, pregnant women, Muslims, some foreign-born theater-goers and people requiring medical treatment in the early hours after they invaded. They also allowed anyone who was able to produce a foreign passport to leave the theater unharmed. Two women managed to escape (one of them was injured while escaping). The terrorists said they were ready to kill ten hostages for any of their number killed if the security forces intervened.

==== Olga Romanova ====
At 1:30 AM, Olga Romanova, a 26-year-old civilian acting on her own, entered the theater, crossing the police cordon by herself. She entered the theater and began urging the hostages to stand up to their captors. There was considerable confusion in the auditorium. The terrorists believed she was a Federal Security Service (FSB) agent and she was shot and killed seconds later. Romanova's body was later removed from the building by a Russian medical team, incorrectly reported by the Moscow police as the body of the first hostage who was killed while trying to escape. Romanova was described as "strong-willed", and lived near the theater. It is unknown how she crossed the police lines undetected.

=== Day two – 24 October ===
The Russian government offered the hostage-takers the opportunity to leave for any country other than Russia or Chechnya if they released all hostages unharmed. The hostages made an appeal, possibly under orders or duress, for Putin to cease hostilities in Chechnya and asked him to refrain from assaulting the building. Because of the crisis, Putin canceled an overseas trip that would have included meetings with then-U.S. President George W. Bush and other world leaders.

The hostage-takers demanded to talk with Joseph Kobzon, a member of parliament and singer, and with International Red Cross representatives. Kobzon (accompanied by three people, including a man waving some white fabric like a flag), entered the building about 1:20 PM. Shortly thereafter, a man in his sixties, appearing feeble and distraught, left the theater. The Interfax news agency identified him as a British citizen, but did not provide details. A woman and three children, believed to be Russians, were let out a few minutes later.

Other well-known public and political figures such as Aslambek Aslakhanov, Irina Khakamada, Ruslan Khasbulatov, Boris Nemtsov and Grigory Yavlinsky took part in negotiations with the hostage-takers. Ex-President of the Soviet Union Mikhail Gorbachev also announced his willingness to act as an intermediary in the course of negotiations. Militants also demanded that representatives of the International Red Cross and Médecins Sans Frontières (Doctors Without Borders) come to the theater to lead negotiations. FSB Colonel Konstantin Vasilyev attempted to enter the patio of the theater, but was shot at while approaching the building and forced to retreat.

According to the FSB, thirty nine hostages were set free by the terrorists on 24 October 2002, but they repeated via one of the hostages an earlier threat to start shooting their captives if Russia failed to take their demands seriously. Negotiations on the release of non-Russian nationals were conducted by various embassies and the Chechens promised to release all foreign hostages. The kidnappers claimed they were ready to release 50 Russian hostages if Akhmad Kadyrov, head of Chechnya's pro-Moscow administration, would come to the theater, but Kadyrov did not respond, and the release did not take place.

A hot water pipe burst overnight and was flooding the ground floor. The hostage-takers called the flooding a "provocation" and an FSB spokesman said no agreement had been reached on having the pipe repaired. It later turned out that the sewer system was used by the Russian special forces for listening purposes.

=== Day three – 25 October ===
During the third day, the following people took part in negotiations with the militants: journalists Anna Politkovskaya, Sergey Govorukhin and Mark Franchetti as well as public figures Yevgeny Primakov, Ruslan Aushev and again, Aslambek Aslakhanov. The terrorists demanded negotiations with an official representative of Vladimir Putin. Relatives of the hostages staged anti-war demonstrations outside the theater and in central Moscow.

The hostage-takers agreed to release seventy-five foreign citizens in the presence of diplomatic representatives of their states. 15 Russian citizens were released, including eight children (aged 7 to 13). After a meeting with Putin, the FSB head Nikolai Patrushev offered to spare the lives of the Chechens if they released the remaining hostages unharmed.

A group of Russian doctors including Dr. Leonid Roshal, head of the Medical Center for Catastrophes, entered the theater to bring medicine for the hostages and said the terrorists were not beating or threatening their captives. He said most of the hostages were calm and that only "two or three" of the hostages were hysterical. Some hot food, warm clothes, and medicine had also been taken in by the Red Cross.

NTV channel journalists recorded an interview with Movsar Barayev, in which he sent a message to the Russian government:

We have nothing to lose. We have already covered 2,000 kilometers by coming here. There is no way back... We have come to die. Our motto is freedom and paradise. We already have freedom as we've come to Moscow. Now we want to be in paradise.

He also said the group had come to Moscow not to kill the hostages or to fight with Russia's elite troops, as they had had enough fighting in Chechnya over the years: "We came here with a specific aim – to put an end to the war and that is it."

At 9:55 PM, four hostages (citizens of Azerbaijan) were released, bringing the total number of hostages that were set free on this day to 19.

==== Gennady Vlakh ====
After dusk, a man identified as Gennady Vlakh ran across the square and gained entry to the theater. He said that his son was among the hostages, but his son did not seem to be present and the man was led away and shot by the Chechens. There is considerable confusion surrounding this incident, and Vlakh's body was cremated before it was identified.

==== Denis Gribkov ====
Around midnight, a gunfire incident took place as Denis Gribkov, a 30-year-old male hostage, ran over the backs of theater seats toward the female insurgents who were sitting next to a large improvised explosive device. A male Chechen shot at him and missed, but stray bullets hit and severely wounded Tamara Starkova and fatally wounded Pavel Zakharov, who were evacuated from the building soon after. Gribkov was removed from the auditorium and later found dead from gunshot wounds.

=== Day four – Morning of 26 October ===
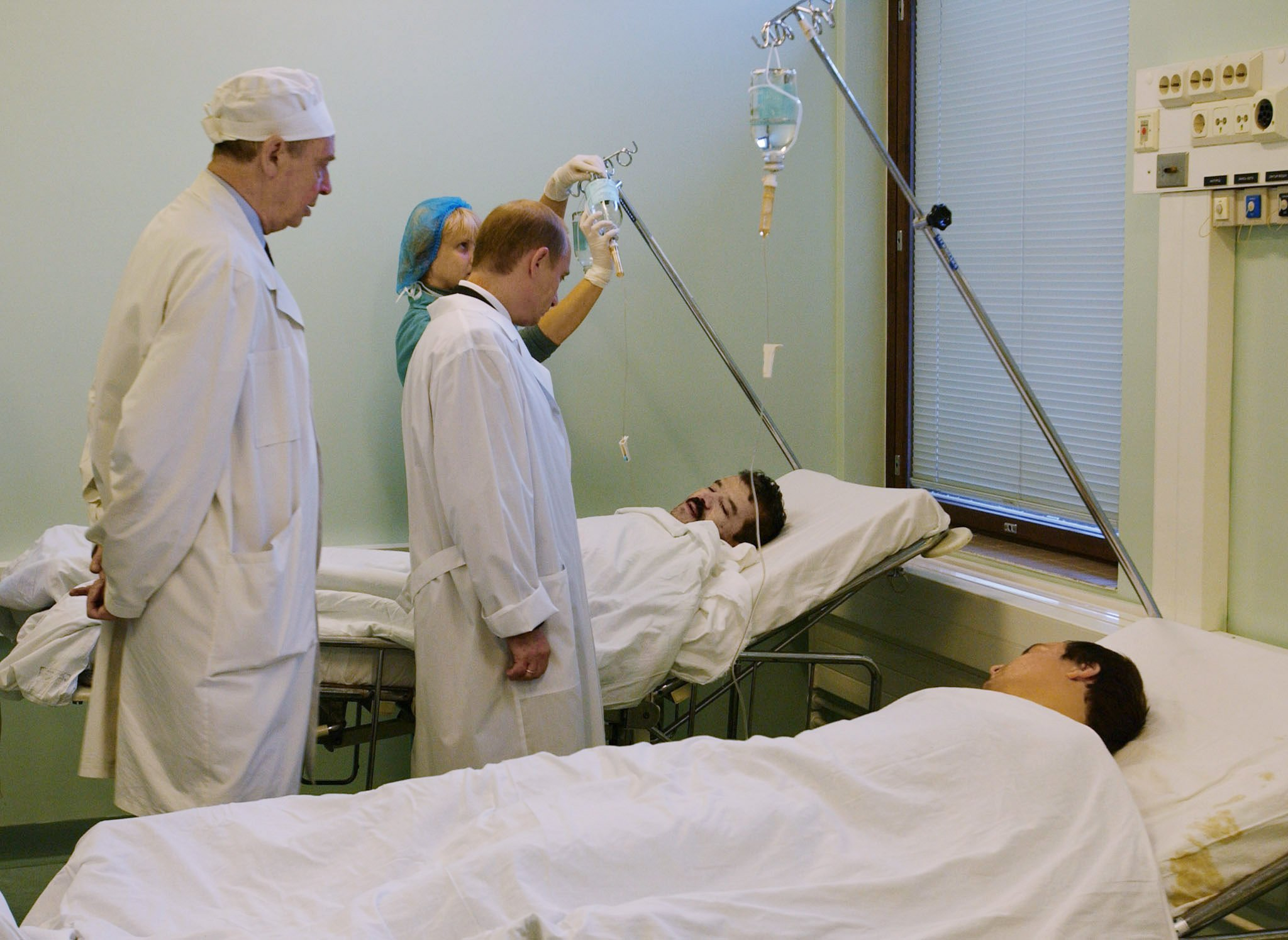
President Vladimir Putin visiting the Sklifosovsky Emergency Medicine Institute to meet with hostages rescued from the theater in Dubrovka.

During the night, Akhmed Zakayev, a Chechen envoy and associate of the separatist President Aslan Maskhadov, appealed to the extremists and asked them to "refrain from rash steps". The Chechens told the BBC that a special representative of President Putin planned to come to the theater for talks the next day. Two members of the Spetsnaz Alpha Group moving around in the no-man's land were seriously wounded by a grenade fired from the building by the terrorists, which was blamed by the Moscow police chief Vladimir Pronin on the media news leak.

According to an officer in the Russian special forces cited by The Guardian, the leak was controlled: "We leaked the information that the storming would take place at three in the morning. The Chechen fighters were on their guard. They began shooting, but there was no raid. Then there was the natural reaction – a relaxation. And at 5 a.m. we stormed the place."

==== Special forces raid ====
Early Saturday morning, 26 October, forces from Russia's Spetsnaz (Special Forces, literally "special purpose") from the FSB (Alpha Group and Vympel), with the assistance of the Russian Ministry of Internal Affairs (MVD) SOBR unit, surrounded and stormed the theater; all were heavily armed and masked. Deputy Interior Minister Vladimir Vasilyev stated that the raid was prompted by a panic among the captives due to the execution of two female hostages. The raid was planned shortly after the hostages were initially seized and the shooting cited as a proximate cause had occurred about three hours before the operation began.

==== Chemical attack ====
Early in the morning before dawn, at around 5:00 a.m. Moscow time, the searchlights that had been illuminating the main entrance to the theater went out.

Inside, although many hostages at first took the gas (aerosol) to be smoke from a fire, it soon became apparent to gunmen and hostages alike that a mysterious gas had been pumped into the building. Different reports said it came either through the specially created hole in the wall, that it was pumped through the theater's ventilation system, or that it emerged from beneath the stage. The security services pumped an aerosol anaesthetic, later stated by Russian Health Minister Yuri Shevchenko to be based on fentanyl, into the theater through the air conditioning system. The discovery caused panic in the auditorium. Hostage Anna Andrianova, a correspondent for Moskovskaya Pravda, called Echo of Moscow radio studio and conducted a live broadcast with hostages who started feeling the effects of the gas used by the government forces and begged them to desist.

==== Assault ====
The Chechens, some of whom were equipped with gas masks, responded by firing blindly at the Russian positions outside. After thirty minutes, when the gas had taken effect, a physical assault on the building commenced. The combined forces entered through numerous building openings, including the roof, the basement, and finally the front door.

When the shooting began, the terrorists told their hostages to lean forward in the theater seats and cover their heads behind the seats. Hostages reported that some people in the audience fell asleep, and some of the gunmen put on respirators. As the terrorists and hostages began to fall unconscious, several of the female terrorists made a dash for the balcony but passed out before they reached the stairs. They were later found shot dead. Two of the Spetsnaz Alpha Group were also overcome by the gas.

After nearly one and a half hours of sporadic gun battles, the Russian special forces blew open the doors to the main hall and poured into the auditorium. In a fierce firefight, federal forces killed most of the still conscious hostage-takers and summarily executed those who had succumbed to the gas.

According to the Russian government, fighting between the troops and the still-conscious Chechen fighters continued in other parts of the building for another 30 minutes to one hour. Initial reports stated that three terrorists were captured alive (the BBC reported that a "handful of surviving fighters were led away in handcuffs") and two of them managed to escape. Later, the government claimed that all hostage-takers had been killed in the storming.

Alpha team troops said that "this is our first successful operation [in] years". Moskovskij Komsomolets cited a Russian special forces operative saying that "if it were a usual storming, we'd have had 150 casualties among our men, added to the hostages."

== Evacuation ==
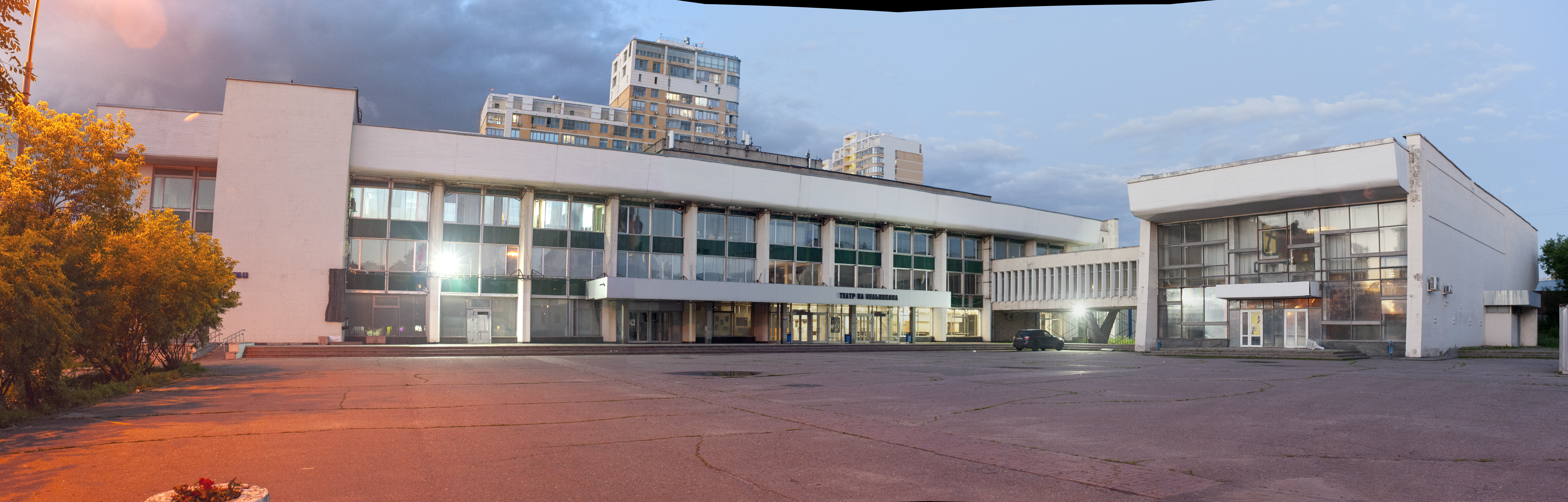
Dubrovka theater building (2024)

At 7:00 a.m., rescuers began carrying the bodies of hostages out of the building. Bodies were laid in rows in the foyer and on the pavement at the main entrance to the TC, unprotected from falling rain and snow. None of the bodies witnessed by The Guardian correspondent Nick Paton Walsh had bullet wounds or showed signs of bleeding, but "their faces were waxy, white and drawn, their eyes open and blank." Shortly, the entire space was filled with bodies of the dead and those unconscious from the gas but still alive.

Ambulances were standing by and ordinary city buses were brought in. Medical workers were expecting to treat victims of explosions and gunfire but not a secret chemical agent. If the drug used was indeed a fentanyl derivative or other μ-opioid receptor agonist, an opioid receptor antagonist drug like naloxone would have counteracted the chemical agent's effects, but would have had to be administered by rescue workers immediately upon arriving, especially given the weakened and dehydrated state of the hostages. Some reports said the drug was used to save some hostages.

The bodies of dead hostages were put in two buses which were parked at the TC. Initial reports said nothing about casualties among the hostages. The crisis HQ representatives went to the college hall, where relatives of the hostages had been waiting, and told them that allegedly there were no fatalities among the hostages. The first official report of fatalities among the hostages came at about 9:00 a.m. Despite the death of five children which had been already reported by medical personnel, the official statement claimed there were no children among the dead.

At 1:00 p.m., Vasilyev announced at a press conference a "definitive" death toll of 67 hostages, who he said were killed by Chechens, but again said no children nor foreigners were among those killed. Armed guards were posted at the hospitals where victims were taken and doctors were ordered not to release any of the theater patients in case militants had concealed themselves among the hostages.

The hostages' family members panicked as the government refused to release any information about which hospitals their loved ones had been taken to, or even whether their relatives were among the dead. The official number of the dead rose to 90, including 25 children, while it was still claimed that the final attack was provoked by the terrorists executing their captives. Later the same day, the official death toll among hostages had risen to at least 118 and the officials had not specified exactly what killed them. By 28 October, of the 646 former hostages who remained hospitalized, 150 were still in intensive care and 45 were in critical condition.

Seventy-three hostages (including six minors) were rendered no medical aid. There were several Chechens among the hostages and it may be that some of them were not treated because of their Chechen names. Money and other valuables belonging to the victims vanished; official reports stated that the valuables were stolen by an FSB officer who was later killed in a car crash. The Russian authorities initially maintained that none of the deaths among the hostages occurred through poisoning. They spoke of health problems that were exacerbated by the three-day ordeal with very little food or water, or indeed, medical attention.

== Casualties ==
The number of estimated casualties varies widely because many hostages remained unaccounted for and were not included in the official list (see below). Some estimates have put the civilian death toll at more than 200 with 204 names on one list, or even 300, including people who died during the year after the siege from complications from the poison gas. Some former hostages and relatives of the victims claim that the death toll from the chemical agent is being kept secret. According to official numbers, 40 terrorists and about 130 hostages died during the raid or in the following days.

Civilian deaths by nationality
Country	Number
Russia	121
Ukraine	3
United States	1
Belarus	1
Austria	1
Bulgaria	1
Netherlands	1
Kazakhstan	1
Azerbaijan	1
Armenia	1
Total	132

Andrei Seltsovsky, Moscow's health committee chairman, announced that all but one of the hostages killed in the raid had died from the effects of the unknown gas rather than from gunshot wounds. The cause of death listed for all hostages was declared to be "terrorism," claiming they died from heart attacks or other physical ailments. Among the fatalities, 17 were Nord-Ost cast members, including two child actors. Of the foreign nationals, three were from Ukraine, and the others were citizens of Austria, Armenia, Belarus, Kazakhstan, the Netherlands and the United States. About 700 surviving hostages were poisoned by the gas, and some of them received injuries leading to second- and third-degree disabilities (indicating medium- and light-severity debilitation in the Russian disability classification system). Several Russian special forces operatives were also poisoned by the gas during the operation. According to court testimony from A. Vorobiev, Director of the Russian Academic Bacteriology Center, most, if not all, of the deaths were caused by suffocation when hostages collapsed on chairs with heads falling back or were transported and left lying on their backs by rescue workers; in such a position, tongue prolapse causes blockage of breathing.

== Responsibility ==
The operation was conducted primarily by the Chechen radical militant group The Special Purpose Islamic Regiment (SPIR), with involvement from the RSRSBCM and International Islamic Brigade. The operation was led by Movsar Barayev.

Military commander Shamil Basayev posted a statement on his website claiming ultimate responsibility for the incident, resigning all official positions within the Chechen government and promising new attacks. He also apologized to Chechnya's elected president and separatist leader Aslan Maskhadov for not informing him of the planned raid and asked him for forgiveness. Basayev defended the hostage-taking for giving "all Russians a first-hand insight into all the charms of the war unleashed by Russia and take it back to where it originated from" and said that his "main goal will be destroying the enemy and exacting maximum damage" and "the next time, those who come won't make any demands, won't take hostages."

The Russian government claimed that wiretapped phone conversations prove that Maskhadov knew of the plans in advance, which he denied. Aslan Maskhadov and his representatives in the West condemned the attack which they said had nothing to do with official policy. Maskhadov said he felt responsible for those "who resorted to self-sacrifice in despair", but also said the "barbaric and inhumane policies" of the Russian leadership were ultimately to blame and criticized the storming of the theater. He offered to start unconditional peace talks with the Russian government to find a political solution to the conflict in Chechnya.

The siege was seen as a public relations disaster for Maskhadov, and his more radical Islamic field commanders correspondingly benefited. Some commentators suggested that Movladi Udugov was in charge from behind the scenes. Russian military expert Pavel Felgenhauer suggested that the aim of the extremist leaders seemed to have been to provoke the Russian government forces "to kill ethnic Russians in Moscow on a large scale", which happened. According to the report by Russian investigators, Zura Barayeva, the widow of Arbi Barayev, led the female members of the group, while a man known as Yasir, identified by his documents as Idris Alkhazurov, was said to be the group's "ideologist" believed to be trained in Saudi Arabia. Russian officials said Chechen militants received financing from groups based in Turkey and that they intercepted telephone calls from the captors to unidentified embassies in Moscow, as well as to Turkey and the United Arab Emirates.

== Aftermath ==
After the raid, Moscow Mayor Yuri Luzhkov said that "the operation was carried out brilliantly by special forces;" he claimed he had wanted a negotiated end to the crisis, but the final attack was made necessary by the reported killing of hostages. The Russian presidential special envoy for human rights in Chechnya, Abdul-Khakim Sultygov, said the bloody outcome was "a good lesson to the terrorists and their accomplices."

Deputy Interior Minister Vasilyev launched a Moscow-wide operation to catch anyone who might have helped the militants, while his superior, Interior Minister Boris Gryzlov, urged people to be vigilant and to report anyone acting suspiciously to police. On 29 October, Vasilyev said he had the authority to state only that special chemical agents had been used and that some 30 suspected militants and their collaborators, including several civil servants and security officers, had been arrested around the theater and in other parts of the city in what Gryzlov called an "unprecedented operation" to identify what he described as a vast terrorist network in Moscow and the surrounding region.

Russian President Vladimir Putin defended the scale and violence of the assault in a televised address later on the morning of 26 October, stating that the government had "achieved the near impossible, saving hundreds... of people" and that the rescue "proved it is impossible to bring Russia to its knees". Putin thanked the special forces as well as the Russian citizens for their "bravery" and the international community for the support given against the "common enemy". He also asked forgiveness for not being able to save more of the hostages, and declared Monday a national day of mourning for those who died. He vowed to continue fighting "international terrorism".

On 29 October, Putin released another televised statement, saying: "Russia will respond with measures that are adequate to the threat to the Russian Federation, striking all the places where the terrorists themselves, the organizers of these crimes and their ideological and financial inspirations are. I stress, wherever they may be located." It was commonly assumed Putin was threatening the former Soviet Republic of Georgia. Putin's comments came as British Prime Minister Tony Blair phoned him to congratulate him on the ending of the siege.

President Putin was unhappy with the coverage of the hostage crisis by NTV, the last nationwide TV channel effectively independent of the government. In January 2003 the management of NTV was replaced, resulting in a profound effect on its editorial policy.

=== Long-term consequences ===
The attacks prompted Putin's government to take harsher measures against Chechen separatists. On 28 October, two days after the crisis, he announced that unspecified "measures adequate to the threat" would henceforth be taken in response to terrorist activity, with reports of 30 fighters killed near the Chechen capital Grozny. The Russian Ministry of Defence cancelled plans to reduce the 80,000 troop presence in the tiny breakaway Chechen republic.

In early November, Defence Minister Sergei Ivanov announced Russian forces had launched large-scale operations against separatists throughout Chechnya. The actions of the military caused a new wave of refugees, according to the pro-Moscow Chechen official and the hostage crisis negotiator Aslanbek Aslakhanov.

On 29 May 2008, the European Court of Human Rights (ECHR) unanimously condemned Russia for enforced disappearances in five cases from Chechnya, including the disappearance of two young women in Ulus-Kert (the prosecutor's office initially stated to media that Aminat Dugayeva and Kurbika Zinabdiyeva had been arrested on suspicion of involvement with the Moscow siege).

President Maskhadov's unconditional offer for peace talks with Russia was swiftly dismissed, and Russian Foreign Minister Sergei Lavrov compared such calls with the suggestion that Europe should conduct such talks with the former al-Qaeda leader Osama bin Laden. Russia also accused former Chechen Republic leader Akhmed Zakayev of involvement in the attack. When he visited Denmark for a peace congress in October 2002 (the World Chechen Congress event in Copenhagen), the Russians demanded his arrest and extradition; Zakayev was held for over a month, but was released after Danish authorities stated they were not convinced that sufficient evidence had been provided. The Kremlin also accused the Danish authorities of "solidarity with terrorists" by allowing the meeting of about 100 Chechens, Russian human rights activists and lawmakers from Russia and other European countries to gather and discuss ways to end the fighting.

In early November, the Russian Duma approved a broad array of anti-terrorism legislation ranging from far-reaching restrictions on media coverage of terrorism-related incidents to secret burials for killed terrorists (one lawmaker went as far as to suggest wrapping terrorists' corpses in pigskin and another suggested "carting them around the city with their legs dangling"). The new media law severely restricted the media's reporting of anti-terrorist operations, banning publication or broadcast of "any statement that hinders an operation to break such a siege, or attempts to justify the aims of the hostage-takers". These new policies prompted renewed fears in Russia that Putin was systematically taking control of all Russian media. Sergei Yushenkov, whose Liberal Russia party voted against the change, was quoted by Reuters as saying: "On a wave of emotion, we have in fact legitimised censorship and practically banned criticism of the authorities in emergency situations." Coverage of Chechnya had already been severely restricted, needing the cooperation of both the Russian military and the Moscow-backed Chechen administration (see Russian government censorship of Chechnya coverage). A law by which corpses of people convicted or accused of terrorism would not be released to their families, but disposed of in secret was approved, applying to the bodies of the militants killed in the Moscow crisis, and later applying even to President Maskhadov, who was killed in 2005.

In 2003, Human Rights Watch reported Chechens in Moscow were subjected to increased police harassment after the hostage crisis. Moscow's Chechens rose in numbers from about 20,000 in the Soviet period to an estimated 80,000 in 2002.

Many in the Russian press and in the international media warned that the death of so many hostages in the special forces' rescue operation would severely damage President Putin's popularity. This prediction reportedly turned out to be wrong. Shortly after the siege, the Russian president had record public approval ratings; in December 2002, 83% of Russians reportedly declared themselves satisfied with Putin's rule and his handling of the siege.

== Investigation ==
The official investigation that the Moscow City Prosecutor's Office had been carrying out for three and a half years failed to provide positive information on the gas agent that killed hostages, possible antidote to that agent, the number of hostages released by the operation, the number of militants who had seized the theater (hostages claimed that they saw more than 50 militants, whereas only 40 hostage takers were in the building according to the official version), and the names of officials who had made the decision about the assault. On 1 June 2007, news came that the official investigation had been suspended. The reason provided was that the "culprit had not been located".

The same month, Tatiana Karpova, co-chair of the Nord-Ost Organization of former hostages and families of the dead, demanded a new criminal investigation. She claimed the authorities failed to meet their obligations related to right to life. She stated her concern about the lack of medical care for the injured, and future medical problems for the survivors. In July 2007, relatives of those who died in the hostage-taking urged the Office of the Prosecutor General of Russia to investigate whether senior officials were responsible for the deaths.

=== Claims of FSB involvement ===
The Duma refused to consider a proposal by the liberal democratic Union of Rightist Forces party to form an investigative commission charged with probing the government's actions in the theater siege.

An independent investigation of the event was undertaken by Russian politicians Sergei Yushenkov, Sergei Kovalev, journalist Anna Politkovskaya, Hoover Institute scholar John B. Dunlop, and former FSB officers Aleksander Litvinenko and Mikhail Trepashkin. According to their version, the FSB knew about the terrorist group's arrival in Moscow and directed them to the theater through their agent provocateur Khanpasha Terkibayev ("Abu Bakar"), whose name was in the list of hostage takers and who left the theater alive. In April 2003 Litvinenko gave information about Terkibayev ("the Terkibayev file") to Sergei Yushenkov when he visited London. Yushenkov passed this file to Politkovskaya and she was able to interview Terkibayev in person. A few days later, Yushenkov was assassinated by gunfire in Moscow. Terkibayev was later killed in an apparent car crash in Chechnya.

In June 2003, Litvinenko stated in an interview with the Australian television programme Dateline, that two of the Chechen militants involved in the siege—whom he named "Abdul the Bloody" and "Abu Bakar"—were working for the FSB, and that the agency manipulated the terrorists into staging the attack. Litvinenko said: "[w]hen they tried to find [Abdul the Bloody and Abu Bakar] among the rotting corpses of dead terrorists, they weren't there. The FSB got its agents out. So the FSB agents among Chechens organized the whole thing on FSB orders, and those agents were released". "Abu Bakar" (presumably Terkibayev) was also described as an FSB agent and organizer of the theater siege by Anna Politkovskaya, Alexander Khinshtein and other journalists. Sanobar Shermatova and a co-author had pointed out in "Moskovskie novosti" that Terkibaev had for a number of years been involved in "anti-Wahhabi" activities.

John Dunlop identifies "Abu Bakar" as Ruslan Elmurzaev, claimed by Mikhail Trepaskin to have been a resident of Moscow, not Chechnya, and to have been involved in various criminal activities operating out of the Hotel Salyut in Moscow. There were reports that Elmurzaev had not been killed in the storming of the theater. Film director Sergei Govorukhin, one of the volunteer negotiators at Dubrovka, has said that he is convinced that Elmurzaev, who he identified as an FSB agent, is still alive. Russian prosecutors were unable to show Elmurzaev's corpse and during a visit to Chechnya in October 2003, Russian intelligence officers confirmed to him that Elmurzaev was alive and well and living in Chechnya.

The titular leader of the hostage takers was one Movsar Baraev, the nephew of the late and infamous "Wahhabi kidnapper" Arbi Baraev, a figure reported to have shadowy connections to both the FSB and GRU. In January 2003, the French journalist Anne Nivat reported that Baraev had been arrested two months before the hostage-taking incident. This information being true, Baraev was already in Russian custody when the theater siege occurred. Nivat also reported that two of the female hostage takers were also in Russian custody at the time of the siege while late Duma Deputy Yurii Shchekochikhin wrote that another female hostage taker was in custody at the time.

That "Abu Bakar" was in control and not Baraev was supported by an article in "Moskovskie novosti" by journalists Shermatova and Teit, in which it was reported that a hushed conversation between Abu Bakar and Baraev had been accidentally captured by NTV. Baraev declared that the hostage takers had been sent by Shamil Basaev only to be quietly corrected by Abu Bakar to add 'Aslan Maskhadov', in order to link the latter to the hostage taking. As an evidence against Maskhadov, Russians cited a tape first shown on Al Jazeera and subsequently on Russian television, although only a fragment of the original tape was shown on Russian TV. On the original full length tape it was evident that it had been made in late summer, not in October, and had concerned a military operation against federal forces, not an act of hostage taking. Nevertheless, Maskhadov had been discredited although there is no credible evidence to link him with the siege. In the end, it could be said that both the Russian government and the Chechen extremists had achieved their goals; talk of negotiations had ended and Maskhadov's reputation had been damaged.

There is also the figure of Arman Menkeev, a retired major in the GRU and a specialist in making explosive devices. He was arrested by the Interior Ministry in November 2002 at the Moscow Oblast base allegedly used by the terrorists but was released shortly afterwards. He may have subsequently been rearrested but was not charged with a crime and is apparently not in custody. FSB officers, who interrogated Menkeev in Lefortovo prison, classified him as "loyal to the Russian government", adding that "He knows how to keep a military and state secret". The plastic explosive used by the terrorists was in fact "imitation plastic explosives" which had a "Ministry of Defense origin". The Moscow City Prosecutor's Office claimed that Menkeev could have been the source of this material. Apart from two suicide belts, which were more of a danger to the wearers, the bombs placed in the theater (and elsewhere in Moscow prior to the siege) lacked essential elements like batteries; this provided the required conditions for the successful storming of the theater.

=== Moscow lawsuit and the European Court complaint ===
After the siege, 61 former hostages sought compensation for physical and emotional suffering totaling almost US$60 million from Moscow city authorities. According to Russia's then-new anti-terrorism law, the region where an act of terror occurs should pay compensation for moral and material damages. Moscow Mayor Yuri Luzhkov's office denounced the suits, saying it could not be held responsible as "the Chechen issue and its consequences are not within the jurisdiction of the Moscow authorities in any way." The Moscow administration earlier agreed to pay 50,000 roubles ($1,570) in compensation to each former hostage and 100,000 roubles ($3,140) to relatives of those killed. In all but one of the cases, Moscow city courts rejected the compensation claims.

In July 2003, 80 plaintiffs from Russia, Ukraine, the Netherlands, and Kazakhstan turned to the European Court for Human Rights, claiming that their right to life had been violated by Russian authorities' handling of the standoff. In April 2007, Igor Trunov, the claimants' advocate, reported that the ECHR had finally begun hearings into a complaint filed in 2003 by the victims against the Russian government. Trunov added that not only Russian citizens, but also those from Ukraine, the Netherlands, and Kazakhstan, filed complaints in the Strasbourg Court. The plaintiffs demand €50,000 each in compensation for the violation of their human rights. The case was accepted by the court in December 2007.

On 8 July 2008, The Moscow Times reported that the hearings at the European Court of Human Rights would be closed to the public at the request of Russian authorities as, according to Igor Trunov, they had "promised full disclosure on how they handled the crisis", including "the makeup of the knockout gas used in the storming of the theater by commandos."

On 20 December 2011, the European Court of Human Rights published its judgement in the case, ordering Russia to pay the 64 applicants a total of 1.3 million euros in compensation. The court also found that Russia had violated Article 2 of the European Convention on Human Rights when handling the hostage crisis, "with inadequate planning and conduct of the rescue operation", and with the "authorities' failure to conduct an effective investigation into the rescue operation", although the Court found that there had been "no violation of Article 2 of the Convention on account of the decision by the authorities to resolve the hostage crisis by force and to use the gas."

=== Chemical agent mystery and subsequent identification ===
It was reported that efforts to treat victims were complicated because the Russian government refused to inform doctors what type of gas had been used. In the records of the official investigation, the agent is referred to as a "gaseous substance". In other cases, it is referred to as an "unidentified chemical substance".

The Russian Federation, as a member-state of the Chemical Weapons Convention, undertook "never and under no circumstances to carry out any activities prohibited to member-states of this Convention to develop, to accumulate, to stockpile and to use chemical weapons that can cause death, temporary incapacitation, or permanent harm to humans or animals." The Convention obliges the states to fulfill the conditions of toxic chemicals' use that allow to exclude or considerably reduce the degree of injury and gravity of consequences. (The Convention allows the use of some chemical agents like tear gas for "law enforcement including domestic riot control", but requires that "riot control agents" have effects that "disappear within a short time following termination of exposure.")

Analysis of drug residue from the clothing of two British hostages and the urine of a third British hostage, by a team of researchers at the British chemical and biological defense laboratories at Porton Down, Wiltshire, England, indicated that two fentanyl derivatives had been used. Neither of those two were fentanyl or 3-methylfentanyl (the Russian Minister of Health earlier said that fentanyl or one of its derivatives had been used, but did not specify which derivatives).

The Porton Down analysis by James R. Riches and his colleagues showed that while fentanyl or 3-methylfentanyl were absent from the urine of one survivor and residues of the agent in the clothing of two other British survivors, the veterinary large animal sedative drug carfentanil and anesthetic agent remifentanil were identified by liquid chromatographic tandem mass spectrometry in one hostage's urine and on the clothing of three hostages who had returned to Britain after the hostage rescue. The authors concluded that carfentanil and remifentanil were used as a mixture in the chemical agent employed by Russian troops to subdue the Chechen terrorists and hostages at the Barricade Theater, perhaps suspended in the anesthetic agent halothane.

== International reaction ==
- United Nations – In unanimously adopting Resolution 1440 (2002), the United Nations Security Council condemned the attack and demanded the immediate and unconditional release of all hostages. The council also expressed their sympathies and condolences to the victims, Russian people, and government of Russia, and urged all states to cooperate with Russian authorities in bringing those responsible to justice.
- Iraq – Iraqi President Saddam Hussein condemned the attack in a television broadcast, arguing it would ultimately benefit the United States and Israel in undermining Islam: "It's not wise for the Chechens to lose the sympathy of Russia and the Russian people. The tyrant of our era is Zionism and America, and not Russia, China or India."

== In popular culture ==
In 2003, HBO broadcast Terror in Moscow, a documentary directed by Dan Reed. Interviews with hostages and footage taken inside and outside the theater during the crisis are shown.

In 2004 a documentary by the BBC's Horizon investigated the gas that was pumped into the theater.

A Russian DLC released in 2005 for Postal 2 known as "Штопор ЖжОт" (Corkscrew Rules) contains a reference to the attack, in a mission where the protagonist must defend himself from terrorists and police during an attack in a theater.

The 2006 play In Your Hands is based on the events of the Moscow theater siege, written by Natalia Pelevine, opened in London at the New End Theatre. In April 2008, Pelevine said that Russian authorities had banned the play following its Russian debut in the city of Makhachkala, the capital of Dagestan near Chechnya.

The play We Declare You a Terrorist, by Tim J. Lord and based upon the attack, premiered at the 2009 Summer Play Festival.

The 2015 first-person shooter game Tom Clancy's Rainbow Six Siege cites the crisis and FSB response as an inspiration for their hostage rescue game mode.

Part III Episode 6 of the Netflix Spanish drama series Money Heist (La Casa de Papel) contains spoken references to the theater crisis and the use of halothane gas, with critique of Putin's indifference to the fates of the hostages and hostage-takers. In the series, Spanish authorities eventually use halothane gas to assault a bank during a hostage crisis.

In Season 1 Episode 9 of FBI: International, Bulgarian authorities nearly use poison gas to resolve a terrorist hostage-taking in a theater in Sofia, which the Federal Bureau of Investigation, sent to assist Bulgarian authorities, strongly objects to. The standoff is ultimately resolved without the gas being deployed.

The 2020 film Conference (Конференция) follows theater crisis survivor Natasha (Natalya Pavlenko) who returns to the theater to hold a memorial, finally able to confront her survivor's guilt and her estranged daughter and husband. The film is by Russian writer and director Igor I. Tverdovskiy.

Christopher Nolan's movie Tenet, released in August 2020, opens with a prologue that fans and critics have speculated is based on the attack.

== See also ==
- List of hostage crises
- Crocus City Hall attack
