= Lethality =

How capable something is of causing death

Lethality (also called deadliness or perniciousness) is how capable something is of causing death. Most often it is used when referring to diseases, chemical weapons, biological weapons, or their toxic chemical components.

== Use ==
The use of this term denotes the ability of these weapons to kill, but also the possibility that they may not kill.

Reasons for the lethality of a weapon to be inconsistent, or expressed by percentage, can be as varied as minimized exposure to the weapon, previous exposure to the weapon minimizing susceptibility, degradation of the weapon over time and/or distance, and incorrect deployment of a multi-component weapon.

This term can also refer to the after-effects of weapon use, such as nuclear fallout, which has highest lethality nearest the deployment site, and in proportion to the subject's size and nature; e.g. a child or small animal.

Lethality can also refer to the after-effects of a major chemical or oil/gas process loss of containment, causing fire, explosion, or a toxic cloud. Lethality curves can be developed in process safety to assess and describe mortality patterns around the accident location. The impact is typically greatest closest to the event site and lessens to the outskirts of the impact zone. Blast overpressure, thermal radiation, toxicity and location affect the degree of lethality.

Lethality is also a term used by microbiologists and food scientists as a measure of the ability of a process to destroy bacteria. Lethality may be determined by enumeration of survivors after incremental exposures.

== See also ==
- Lethal dose, an indication of the lethal toxicity of a given substance or type of radiation
- Stopping power
- Toxicity
