= Carfentanil =

Synthetic opioid analgesic

- Molecular structure of carfentanil

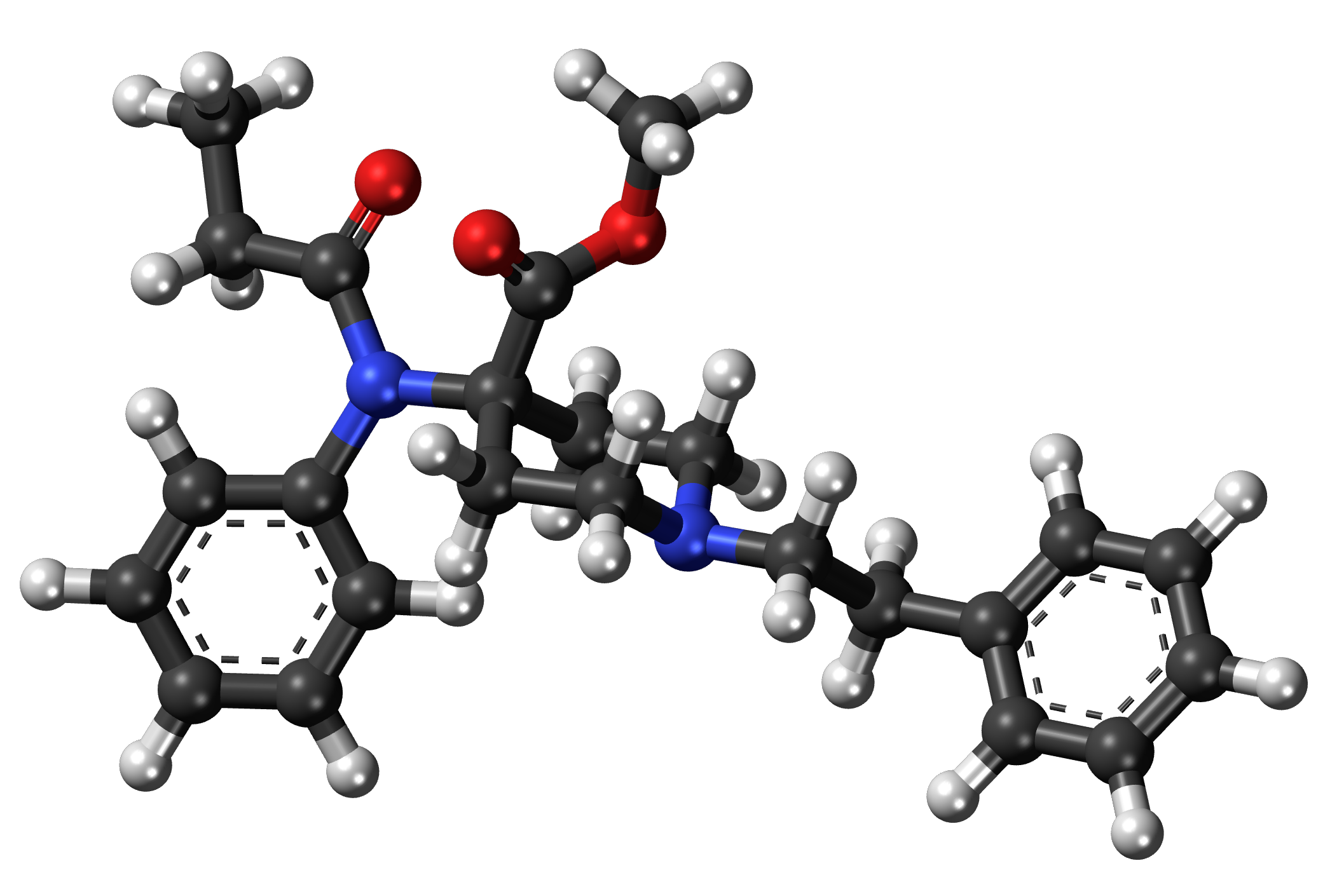
- 3D representation of a carfentanil molecule

Clinical data
- Trade names: Wildnil
- Other names: (4-Methoxycarbonyl)fentanyl, R-33799
- AHFS/Drugs.com: International Drug Names
- ATC code: None

Legal status
- Legal status: AU: S8 (Controlled drug); BR: Class F1 (Prohibited narcotics); CA: Schedule I; DE: Anlage I (Authorized scientific use only); UK: Class A; US: Schedule II; IN: Schedule X (Veterinary use only)

Pharmacokinetic data
- Elimination half-life: 7.7 hours

Identifiers
- IUPAC name: Methyl 1-(2-phenylethyl)-4-[phenyl(propanoyl)amino]piperidine-4-carboxylate
- CAS Number: 59708-52-0
- PubChem CID: 62156
- IUPHAR/BPS: 10040
- DrugBank: DB01535
- ChemSpider: 55986
- UNII: LA9DTA2L8F
- KEGG: D07620
- ChEBI: CHEBI:61084
- ChEMBL: ChEMBL290429
- CompTox Dashboard (EPA): DTXSID40208427
- ECHA InfoCard: 100.352.183

Chemical and physical data
- Formula: C_{24}H_{30}N_{2}O_{3}
- Molar mass: 394.515 g·mol^{−1}
- 3D model (JSmol): Interactive image
- SMILES: CCC(=O)N(c1ccccc1)C2(C(=O)OC)CCN(CC2)CCc3ccccc3
- InChI: InChI=1S/C24H30N2O3/c1-3-22(27)26(21-12-8-5-9-13-21)24(23(28)29-2)15-18-25(19-16-24)17-14-20-10-6-4-7-11-20/h4-13H,3,14-19H2,1-2H3; Key:YDSDEBIZUNNPOB-UHFFFAOYSA-N

Carfentanil or carfentanyl, formerly sold under the brand name Wildnil, is an extremely potent opioid analgesic formerly used in veterinary medicine to anesthetize large animals such as elephants and rhinoceroses. It is a structural analogue of the synthetic opioid analgesic fentanyl. It is typically administered in this context by tranquilizer dart. Carfentanil has also been used in humans to image opioid receptors. It has additionally been used as a recreational drug, typically by injection, insufflation, or inhalation. Deaths have been reported in association with carfentanil.

Effects and side effects of carfentanil in humans are similar to those of other opioids and include euphoria, relaxation, pain relief, pupil constriction, drowsiness, sedation, slowed heart rate, low blood pressure, lowered body temperature, loss of consciousness, and suppression of breathing. The effects of carfentanil, including overdose, can be reversed by the opioid antagonists naloxone and naltrexone, though higher doses than usual may be necessary compared to other opioids. It acts as an ultrapotent and highly selective agonist of the μ-opioid receptor.

Carfentanil was first synthesized in 1974 by a team of chemists at Janssen Pharmaceuticals which included Paul Janssen. It was introduced into veterinary medicine in 1986. Carfentanil is legally controlled in most jurisdictions.

== Uses ==
=== Veterinary use ===
Chosen for its high therapeutic index, carfentanil was first sold in 1986 under the brand name "Wildnil" for use in combination with an α_{2}-receptor agonist as a tranquilizing agent for large ungulates, elephants, and large carnivores. Commercial production of Wildnil ceased in 2003; the drug is now available only in compounded form and not available for veterinary use due to human abuse. Since then, etorphine has become the standard tranquilizing agent for large mammals, with diprenorphine as the preferred reversal agent. Diprenorphine was also used previously to reverse the effects of carfentanil.

=== Clinical use ===
Carfentanil has been used at doses of less than 7 μg as a radiotracer for positron emission tomography imaging of the μ-opioid receptor in the brain in humans.

== Pharmacology ==
=== Pharmacodynamics ===
Carfentanil acts as a highly selective agonist of the μ-opioid receptor. It showed affinity values (K_{i}) of 0.051 nM for the μ-opioid receptor, 4.7 nM for the δ-opioid receptor, and 13 nM for the κ-opioid receptor in rat brain. Thus, carfentanil displayed 90- and 250-fold selectivity for the μ-opioid receptor over the δ-opioid receptor and the κ-opioid receptor, respectively. With human proteins, the affinities were 0.024 nM for the μ-opioid receptor, 3.3 nM for the δ-opioid receptor, and 43 nM for the κ-opioid receptor, demonstrating 140- and 1,800-fold selectivity for the μ-opioid receptor over the δ- and κ-opioid receptors, respectively. Carfentanil appears to have higher affinity for the μ_{1}-opioid receptor over the μ_{2}-opioid receptor. Carfentanil has approximately 10,000 times the analgesic potency of morphine, 4,000 times the potency of heroin, and 20 to 100 times the potency of fentanyl in animal studies. The effects of carfentanil are reversed by μ-opioid receptor antagonists like naloxone and naltrexone, though higher than normal doses of these agents may be necessary in humans due to the extremely high potency of carfentanil.

=== Pharmacokinetics ===
A lipophilic chemical that can easily cross the blood–brain barrier, carfentanil has a very rapid onset of action and is longer acting than fentanyl. Its elimination half-life in humans was 42 to 51 minutes following an intravenous bolus at an average dose of 1.34 μg (19 ng/kg). However, in a case study of recreational exposure, the half-lives of carfentanil and its metabolite norcarfentanil were estimated to be 5.7 hours and 11.8 hours, respectively.

== History ==
The first reported case of carfentanil overdose in a person was in 1986 when a veterinarian accidentally splashed 1.5 mg carfentanil citrate into his eyes and mouth. Sedation occurred within 2 minutes and naltrexone was administered. The veterinarian was hospitalised but made a full recovery within a day.

=== Increase in illicit use ===
Over three hundred cases of overdose related to fentanyl and Carfentanil analogues were reported between August and November 2016 in several of the United States, including Ohio, West Virginia, Indiana, Kentucky and Florida. In 2017, a Milwaukee, Wisconsin man died from a Carfentanil overdose, likely taken unknowingly with another illegal drug such as heroin or cocaine. Carfentanil is most often taken with heroin or by users who believe they are taking heroin.

=== Seizures by authorities ===
Authorities in Latvia and Lithuania reported seizing Carfentanil as an illicit drug in the early 2000s.

Around 2016, the United States and Canada reported a dramatic increase in shipment of carfentanil and other strong opioid drugs to customers in North America from Chinese chemical supply firms. In June 2016, the Royal Canadian Mounted Police seized one kilogram of carfentanil shipped from China in a box labeled "printer accessories". According to the Canada Border Services Agency, the shipment contained 50 million potentially lethal doses of the drug, in containers labeled as toner cartridges for HP LaserJet printers.

Carfentanil was not a controlled substance in China until 1 March 2017, and until then was manufactured legally and sold openly over the Internet, being actively marketed by several Chinese chemical companies.

=== Moscow theater hostage crisis ===
In 2012, a team of researchers at the British chemical and biological defence laboratories at Porton Down found carfentanil and remifentanil in clothing from two British survivors of the 2002 Moscow theater hostage crisis and in the urine from a third survivor. The team concluded that the Russian military had used an aerosol mist of carfentanil and remifentanil to subdue Chechen hostage takers. Researchers had previously surmised from the available evidence that the Moscow emergency services had not been informed of the use of the agent, despite being instructed to bring opioid antagonists to the scene. Unaware that hundreds of patients had been exposed to high doses of strong opioids, the emergency workers failed to bring sufficient quantities of naloxone and naltrexone to counteract the effects of carfentanil and remifentanil. One hundred and twenty-five people exposed to the aerosol are confirmed to have died from respiratory failure during the incident.

=== Potential as a chemical weapon ===
The toxicity of carfentanil in humans and its ready commercial availability has raised concerns over its potential use as a chemical weapon of mass destruction by rogue nations and terrorist groups. The toxicity of carfentanil has been compared to that of nerve gas.

== Legal status ==
- In Canada, carfentanil is listed as a Schedule I drug. Schedule I classification is for drugs that have no approved use in humans and pose a high risk for abuse.
- In China, carfentanil has been controlled since 2017. The China–United States trade war has included controversy over the effectiveness of this control.
- In Germany, carfentanil and its stereoisomers are controlled by the Betäubungsmittelgesetz as a Anlage I substance and can only be used with the special permission of the authorities.
- In the United States, carfentanil is classified as Schedule II under the Controlled Substances Act with a DEA ACSCN of 9743 and a 2016 annual aggregate manufacturing quota of 19 grams (less than 0.7 oz.). Carfentanil requires approval from the Drug Enforcement Agency for veterinary use.
- in the United Kingdom, carfentanil has been specifically controlled as a Class A drug since 1986.

== See also ==
- Opioid potency comparison
