= Zachistka =

Russian military term for "mopping up" operations

Zachistka (Russian: Зачистка [zɐˈt͡ɕistkə]) is a Russian military euphemism for "mopping up" inside of occupied enemy territory. While the word nominally implies securing an area by clearing out any remaining hostile forces within it, it is notoriously associated with operations involving the mass killing and pillaging, and sometimes ethnic cleansing, of civilian populations by soldiers or other siloviks. These operations were particularly widespread in the Second Chechen War, when they frequently took the form of organized house-to-house searches by Russian troops in a variety of Chechen villages. In English contexts, "zachistka" is exclusively used to embody Russian war crimes in Chechnya and Ukraine.

== In Chechnya ==
=== Novye Aldi ===
The Novye Aldi massacre was a massacre in which Russian federal forces summarily executed between 60 and 82 civilians in the Novye Aldi (Aldy) suburb of Grozny, in the course of a "mopping-up" operation conducted there on February 5, 2000. Numerous houses were also burned, civilian property was stolen in an organized manner and at least six women were raped.

=== Alkhan-Kala ===
The Alkhan-Kala operation was a week-long military zachistka by the Russian Spetsnaz special forces in Alkhan-Kala, Chechnya, south-west of the capital Grozny, from June 22, 2001, to June 28, 2001. The operation resulted in a major Russian victory, including the death of Arbi Barayev, a high-ranking Chechen separatist warlord, Islamist, and organized crime figure.

=== Tsotsin-Yurt ===
The Tsotsin-Yurt operation was a four-day zachistka by Russian Spetsnaz in Tsotsin-Yurt, Chechnya, starting on December 30, 2001. Officially, armed clashes broke out between Russian forces and Chechen separatists in the large village of Tsotsin-Yurt, south-east of Grozny. The outcome of the operation is disputed, and Russian troops were accused of widespread human rights violations.

=== Borozdinovskaya ===
The Borozdinovskaya operation was a zachistka by members of the Special Battalion Vostok, an ethnic Chechen unit of the Spetsnaz GRU, on June 4, 2005, in the Avar ethnic minority village of Borozdinovskaya, near Chechnya's border with Dagestan. At least 12 residents, 11 of which were Avar, were killed or "disappeared". Representatives of the Russian federal authorities expressed outrage over the incident, and the commander of the unit responsible was convicted.

== In Ukraine ==
=== Bucha ===
In March 2022, after withdrawing from the village of Bucha outside of Kyiv, the Russian armed forces were reported to have systematically killed over 310 civilians. Over 40 victims were found in the street, shot in the head with their hands tied on their backs. Two mass graves, containing over 270 civilians were also found. In intercepted conversations, Russian soldiers referred to these operations involving hunting down people in lists, filtration, torture, and execution as zachistka ("cleansing"). Pro-Russian sources has denied that Russian troops was behind the killings and blamed Ukrainian extremists.

== See also ==
- Chechen genocide
- Allegations of genocide of Ukrainians in the Russian invasion of Ukraine
- Bandenbekämpfung, a similar German military euphemism
