= Anatoly Pozdnyakov =

Russian general

- Born: 10 October 1949; Kirovograd Oblast, Ukrainian SSR
- Died: September 17, 2001 (aged 51); Chechnya, Russia
- Military career
- Allegiance: Russia
- Branch: Russian Ground Forces
- Service years: 1967–2001
- Rank: Major general

Anatoly Grigoryevich Pozdnyakov (Russian: Анатолий Григорьевич Поздняков; 10 October 1949 – 17 September 2001) was a Russian Major general, incorrectly identified as a Lieutenant General, and aide to Chief of the General Staff Anatoly Kvashnin.

== Career ==
Pozdnyakov was born on 10 October 1949 in Kirovohrad Oblast, Ukrainian SSR. He graduated from the Kiev Suvorov Military School in 1967, entering the Kharkov Higher Tank Command School on 1 September 1967. After graduating from the school in 1971, Pozdnyakov served in tank units. He graduated from the Military Academy of the General Staff in 1993. Pozdnyakov fought in the Second Chechen War from 1999, and by the time of his death was deputy head of the 2nd sub-directorate of the Main Operations Directorate of the Russian General Staff.

== Death ==
Pozdnyakov was killed on 17 September 2001 when a surface-to-air-missile downed his Mil Mi-8 helicopter in Chechnya (see 2001 Grozny Mi-8 crash). Official reports concluded that the attack on the helicopter was orchestrated by members of a Chechen terrorist group specialized in targeting high-ranking Russian military personnel.

Journalist Anna Politkovskaya, however, claimed that Pozdnyakov was assassinated by members of the Russian military. Pozdnyakov headed a General Staff "inspection team" and, according to Politkovskaya, communicated to her in an interview shortly before his death that he had been tasked by President Vladimir Putin to investigate and report on "military crimes".

In A Small Corner of Hell: Dispatches from Chechnya, Politkovskaya wrote:

This is one of Chechnya's main problems. It's not the militants' craftiness or armaments or the foreign origins of their weapons, but the betrayal by its own "defenders." Those who want the war to go on are capable of anything. For example, the total blockade of Grozny that on September 17, 2001, created all the necessary conditions for antiaircraft rocket shooting at certain generals. Shooting without witnesses.

— Anna Politkovskaya, A Small Corner of Hell: Dispatches from Chechnya, p. 65

== See also ==
- 2001 Grozny Mi-8 crash
- List of Second Chechen War assassinations
