= 2001 Grozny Mi-8 crash =

Military aircraft accident

Coordinates: 43°24′N 45°43′E

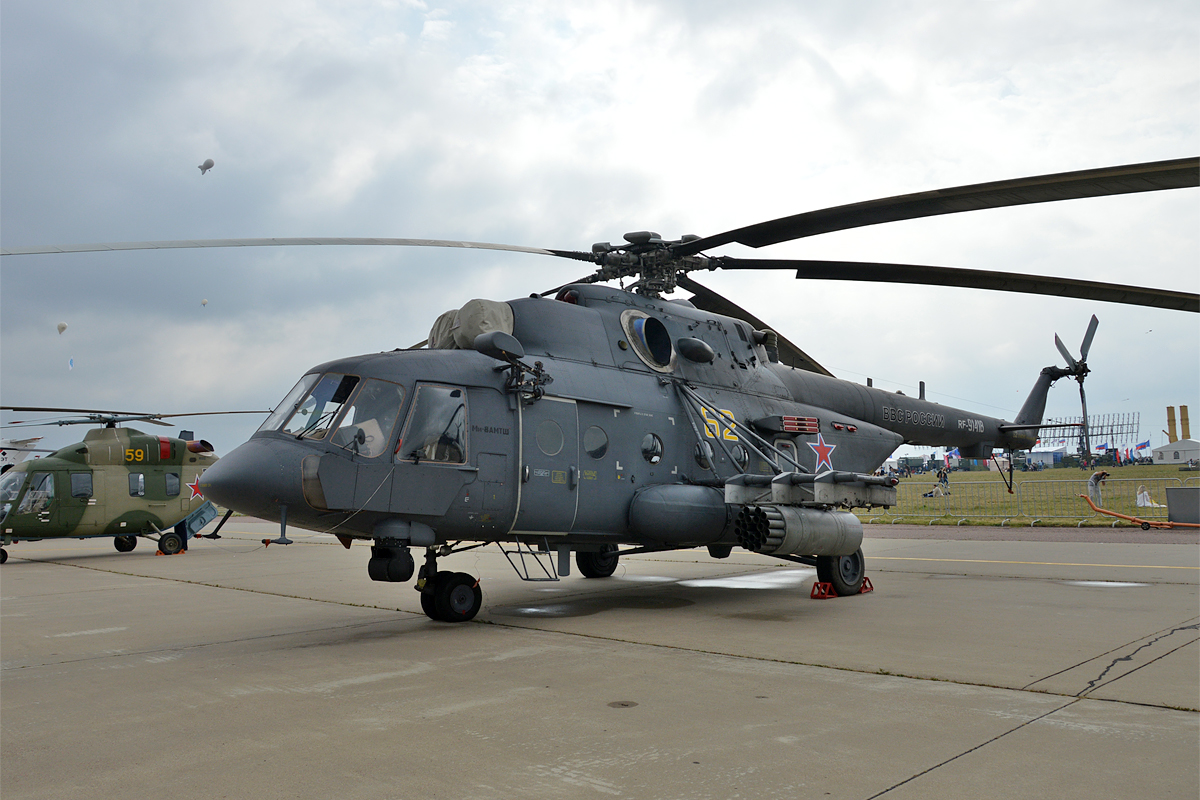
- A Russian Mil-Mi-8 similar to the aircraft involved in the incident.

Occurrence
- Date: September 17, 2001
- Summary: Shot down by missile
- Site: Grozny, Chechnya

Aircraft
- Aircraft type: Mil Mi-8
- Operator: Russian Armed Forces
- Passengers: 10
- Crew: 3
- Fatalities: 13
- Survivors: 0

The 2001 Grozny Mil Mi-8 crash in Chechnya killed 13 Russian military personnel, mostly senior military officers including two generals.

On September 17, 2001, a surface-to-air missile fired by a special Chechen group targeting Russian commanders downed a VIP Mil Mi-8 helicopter over Grozny, killing Major-General Anatoly Pozdnyakov, member of the General Staff of the Russian Armed Forces, Major-General Pavel Varfolomeyev, deputy director of staff of the Ministry of Defence of Russia, eight Colonels (Igor Abramov, Igor Khakhalkin, Yuri Makhov, Vladimir Smolennikov, Sergei Toryanik, Nikolai Lyubimsky, Igor Tribuntsov, and Vladimir Talayev), and three crewmembers.

In 2005, four members of a group called "Ichkeria defense" were sentenced for the downing of the aircraft.

According to an alternative version, described by Anna Politkovskaya, the helicopter was downed by corrupt Russian forces. According to Politkovskaya:

The city was sealed off after a series of strange events there. Controls were so tight you couldn't even move between different districts within the city, let alone make your way out of Grozny on foot. On that day, 17 September, a helicopter carrying a commission, headed by Major-General Anatoly Pozdnyakov, from the General Staff in Moscow was shot down directly over the city. The general was engaged in work quite unprecedented for a soldier in Chechnya. Only an hour before the helicopter was shot down, he told me the task of his commission was to gather data on crimes committed by the military, analyse their findings, put them in some order and then submit the information for the president's consideration. Nothing of the kind had been done before. The helicopter in which they were flying out of Grozny was shot down almost exactly over the city centre. All the members of the commission perished, and since they were already on their way to Khankala airbase to take a plane back to Moscow, so did all the material they had collected.
