= Arbi Barayev =

Chechen warlord (1974–2001)

- Barayev in 1999
- Native name: Арби Алаутдинович Бараев
- Nickname: The Terminator
- Born: Arbi Alautdinovich Barayev; 27 May 1974; Alkhan-Kala, Checheno–Ingush ASSR, Soviet Union
- Died: 22 June 2001 (aged 27) Alkhan-Kala, Chechnya, Russia
- Commands: Special Purpose Islamic Regiment; Sharia Regiment
- Conflicts: First Chechen War; War of Dagestan; Second Chechen War

Arbi Alautdinovich Barayev (Chechen: Арби Алаутдинович Бараев; 27 May 1974 – 22 June 2001) was a Chechen warlord who in 1996 became the founder and first leader of the Special Purpose Islamic Regiment (SPIR) in Chechnya.

Nicknamed "The Terminator", Barayev and the SPIR were regarded as one of the main violent criminal organizations operating in Chechnya during the lawless interwar period that followed the 1994–1996 First Chechen War, driving out foreign journalists and humanitarian workers, while undermining the presidency of Aslan Maskhadov during Chechnya's de facto independence until 1999.

After the restoration of Russian control, Barayev openly lived in his home village until he was killed on 22 June 2001.

== Biography ==
=== Early life ===
Arbi Alautdinovich Barayev was born on 27 May 1974, in Alkhan-Kala, Chechen–Ingush ASSR, Soviet Union. Barayev was a martial arts fan in his youth, and became a police officer in 1990 at the age of 16. In 1991, following the collapse of the Soviet Union and the subsequent declaration of independence Chechnya from the Russian Federation, he became a personal bodyguard to his uncle, Vakha Arsanov, the future vice president. Barayev also protected Vice President Zelimkhan Yandarbiyev, with whom he formed a close personal relationship, and Sultan Geliskhanov, director of Chechnya's State Security Department. In 1994 the First Chechen War began, where Barayev fought on the Chechen separatist side, and it was during this time he committed his first act of kidnapping when he and his men abducted for ransom a group of 29 Russian engineers from a power plant near the Chechen capital, Grozny.

=== Inter-war period ===
The war ended in 1996, with a Chechen separatist victory establishing a de facto independent Chechnya. Barayev formed the Special Purpose Islamic Regiment, where he and his associates became infamous for their alleged part in a wave of lawlessness which swept the devastated country. Crimes included brutal killings and kidnappings as well as suspected involvement in two failed attempts to assassinate the Chechen president Aslan Maskhadov, and the successful assassinations of the Chechen interior minister Nasrudi Bazhiyev, and Shadid Bargishev, head of the newly formed anti-abduction service. The group, based around the town of Urus-Martan, were linked to a series of high-profile crimes including the notorious murder of six foreign Red Cross employees shot dead in the hospital of Novye Atagi in September 1996, as well as the kidnappings of Yelena Masyuk, a Russian NTV journalist and personal friend of President Maskhadov, and Valenti Vlasov, Russian president Boris Yeltsin's envoy to Chechnya. Other high-profile hostages allegedly kidnapped by Barayev included the ORT journalists Roman Pereveztsyev and Vladislav Tibelius, an Italian journalist Mauro Galligani, British children-aid workers Camilla Carr and Jon James (during a failed operation to rescue them, the Chechen anti-kidnap unit commandos engaged in a deadly clash with "unknown terrorists", unofficially Salman Raduyev's men; they were eventually ransomed by Boris Berezovsky) and others.

In 1997, Maskhadov signed a decree putting Barayev and his Special Purpose Islamic Regiment under the command of the Chechen interior ministry. However, Barayev, who also held the post of deputy commander of the National Guards, refused to obey the order. When six of his men were detained in Ingushetia, Barayev attacked an Ingush police post and took hostages; one of them was killed and the rest were prisoner-swapped. Two more of his men were captured in Chechnya and made to confess to kidnappings on the state TV. His militia and some Islamist allies from Shariah Security forces fought with the Chechen government forces in a large-scale gun battle in the city of Gudermes in the summer of 1998. Between 50 and around 80 people were killed in the mutiny. The SPIR was not disarmed, but Barayev was stripped of his rank of Brigade General and declared as the "enemy of Ichkeria and the Chechen people". In December 1998, Barayev proclaimed the Supreme Council of Islamic Jamaats, dug trenches around Urus-Martan and threatened to attack targets across and outside of Chechnya if Maskhadov tried to fight them.

A common accusation against Barayev regarded the late 1998 abduction and beheading of four foreign mobile phone engineers. It was claimed that the Federal Security Service of the Russian Federation (FSB) outbid the employers of kidnapped British engineers to get them decapitated by Barayev and his gang rather than be released; supposedly, the video and photographic materials of their executions fed the FSB anti-western propaganda efforts at beginning of Second Chechen War.

A former Russian hostage Abdurakhman Adukhov told the BBC that Barayev told him it was actually Osama bin Laden who paid him $30m for the atrocity, outbidding the ransom offer of $10m. Barayev himself denied that his group kidnapped and killed the foreigners.

=== Second Chechen War ===
In August 1999, Russia launched the Second Chechen War in response to the Invasion of Dagestan by the Islamic International Brigade. Dagestan borders Chechnya to the east, and as part of the operation Russian troops entered Chechnya on 1 October to restore federal control over the country, effectively ending its de facto independence. In March 2000, during the early phase of the war, Barayev reportedly betrayed the Chechen field commander Ruslan Gelayev to the Russian military forces, resulting in the massacre of Gelayev's forces in the Battle of Komsomolskoye. According to another version, Barayev and his men merely bribed their way out of Komsomolskoye while leaving Gelayev and his people to their fate. The incident led to the declaration of revenge on the part of Gelayev, whose fighters then blew up several houses belonging to Barayev in his home village of Alkhan-Kala near Grozny, killed a number of his men, and even attempted to assassinate Barayev in Ingushetia. According to federal authorities, more than 40 Chechens died as a result of these clashes.

Chechen surgeon Khassan Baiev, who amputated a portion of Shamil Basayev's leg after his injury on a minefield, also operated on Salman Raduyev and Arbi Barayev himself, but Barayev threatened to kill him because he would also help wounded Russian soldiers. Baiev described Barayev as "a born killer, and his men were desperados with blood vendettas proclaimed against them for murder. They joined Barayev for protection against the avengers in an endless cycle of violence. ... He owned a stable of expensive foreign cars, had several wives, and moved around with an escort of twenty to thirty guards. Everyone assumed that he was in the pay of Russian intelligence. Relatives of Arbi Barayev publicly denounced him for his crimes, saying that the family announced in the courtyard of the mosque that if anyone killed him, they would relinquish all claims. There would be no blood revenge." Facing death threats from Barayev as well as from the federal side, Baiev was eventually forced to seek political asylum in the United States.

Following the Russian occupation of most of Chechnya, Barayev freely lived in Alkhan-Kala and frequently passed through Russian Army checkpoints without any problems, using identity papers of an FSB officer, and was also not included in the lists of people wanted "for participation in illegal armed groups". Once arrested, Barayev was said to be instantly released by the demand of Beslan Gantamirov, then the leading figure in the pro-Moscow government. In May 2000, the Russian military intelligence GRU officer leaked papers about Barayev's affiliation with FSB to a Chechen journalist. In April 2001, Barayev's men allegedly ambushed and killed Viktor Popkov, a Russian dissident working in Chechnya as an aid worker and human rights activist since 1995, in the close vicinity of a military roadblock. According to the United States Department of State, Barayev sent a group of his fighters to train in Taliban-controlled areas of Afghanistan in the spring of the same year.

=== Death ===
On 22 June 2001, Barayev was reported killed during a raid by the Russian military special forces on Alkhan-Kala. According to a Russian military spokesman, 17 Chechens and at least one soldier were killed in the operation. The Russian media had reported his death several previous times, but every time he re-emerged unscathed; however, this time, the Kavkaz Center announced that "Special Islamic commander Arbi Barayev has become a martyr." According to another version of Barayev's death, the GRU decided to eliminate him after the suspicious death of FSB chief Vice-Admiral German Ugryumov, who allegedly provided cover for Barayev. In a well-prepared five-day operation, GRU agents recruited from Chechens in a blood feud with Barayev searched for him in Alkhan-Kala and then stormed a local FSB base where he ran for cover, killing an FSB agent in the process. Barayev was allegedly captured alive and then tortured to death. His body was given to his immediate family for a funeral (in contrast, when Maskhadov was killed in 2005, he was buried by the Russians in an unmarked secret grave). He was, however, barred from being buried in his home village by the local people.

In October 2002, the continuation of the SPIR carried out the Moscow theater hostage crisis, led by Barayev's 22-year-old nephew and successor Movsar and featured his widow Zura Barayeva, both of whom died in the attack. The remnants of Barayev's group were reportedly integrated into the mainstream rebel forces following the theatre seizure.
